

205001–205100 

|-bgcolor=#d6d6d6
| 205001 ||  || — || November 11, 1996 || Kitt Peak || Spacewatch || — || align=right | 2.7 km || 
|-id=002 bgcolor=#fefefe
| 205002 ||  || — || December 6, 1996 || Kitt Peak || Spacewatch || V || align=right | 1.1 km || 
|-id=003 bgcolor=#d6d6d6
| 205003 ||  || — || December 2, 1996 || Kitt Peak || Spacewatch || EOS || align=right | 2.9 km || 
|-id=004 bgcolor=#E9E9E9
| 205004 ||  || — || January 3, 1997 || Kitt Peak || Spacewatch || — || align=right | 1.2 km || 
|-id=005 bgcolor=#E9E9E9
| 205005 ||  || — || January 10, 1997 || Kitt Peak || Spacewatch || — || align=right | 1.2 km || 
|-id=006 bgcolor=#E9E9E9
| 205006 ||  || — || January 15, 1997 || San Marcello || L. Tesi, G. Cattani || — || align=right | 1.6 km || 
|-id=007 bgcolor=#E9E9E9
| 205007 ||  || — || February 6, 1997 || Kitt Peak || Spacewatch || — || align=right | 1.1 km || 
|-id=008 bgcolor=#E9E9E9
| 205008 ||  || — || March 2, 1997 || Kitt Peak || Spacewatch || — || align=right | 1.1 km || 
|-id=009 bgcolor=#E9E9E9
| 205009 ||  || — || April 27, 1997 || Kitt Peak || Spacewatch || — || align=right | 1.6 km || 
|-id=010 bgcolor=#E9E9E9
| 205010 ||  || — || May 27, 1997 || Caussols || ODAS || — || align=right | 2.3 km || 
|-id=011 bgcolor=#E9E9E9
| 205011 ||  || — || June 5, 1997 || Kitt Peak || Spacewatch || — || align=right | 2.4 km || 
|-id=012 bgcolor=#fefefe
| 205012 ||  || — || June 7, 1997 || La Silla || E. W. Elst || — || align=right | 1.4 km || 
|-id=013 bgcolor=#E9E9E9
| 205013 ||  || — || August 11, 1997 || Kleť || Kleť Obs. || DOR || align=right | 3.8 km || 
|-id=014 bgcolor=#fefefe
| 205014 ||  || — || September 27, 1997 || Kitt Peak || Spacewatch || V || align=right data-sort-value="0.98" | 980 m || 
|-id=015 bgcolor=#d6d6d6
| 205015 ||  || — || September 28, 1997 || Kitt Peak || Spacewatch || KOR || align=right | 1.6 km || 
|-id=016 bgcolor=#d6d6d6
| 205016 ||  || — || October 4, 1997 || Kitt Peak || Spacewatch || KAR || align=right | 1.5 km || 
|-id=017 bgcolor=#d6d6d6
| 205017 ||  || — || October 23, 1997 || Kitt Peak || Spacewatch || KOR || align=right | 1.6 km || 
|-id=018 bgcolor=#fefefe
| 205018 ||  || — || November 23, 1997 || Kitt Peak || Spacewatch || — || align=right data-sort-value="0.91" | 910 m || 
|-id=019 bgcolor=#fefefe
| 205019 ||  || — || November 24, 1997 || Kitt Peak || Spacewatch || ERI || align=right | 1.9 km || 
|-id=020 bgcolor=#d6d6d6
| 205020 ||  || — || November 29, 1997 || Socorro || LINEAR || — || align=right | 4.2 km || 
|-id=021 bgcolor=#fefefe
| 205021 ||  || — || December 27, 1997 || Kitt Peak || Spacewatch || NYS || align=right data-sort-value="0.90" | 900 m || 
|-id=022 bgcolor=#d6d6d6
| 205022 ||  || — || January 7, 1998 || Modra || A. Galád, A. Pravda || TIR || align=right | 2.6 km || 
|-id=023 bgcolor=#d6d6d6
| 205023 ||  || — || January 18, 1998 || Kitt Peak || Spacewatch || TIR || align=right | 3.2 km || 
|-id=024 bgcolor=#d6d6d6
| 205024 ||  || — || January 22, 1998 || Kitt Peak || Spacewatch || — || align=right | 2.9 km || 
|-id=025 bgcolor=#d6d6d6
| 205025 ||  || — || January 23, 1998 || Kitt Peak || Spacewatch || — || align=right | 4.4 km || 
|-id=026 bgcolor=#d6d6d6
| 205026 ||  || — || February 17, 1998 || Kitt Peak || Spacewatch || — || align=right | 4.6 km || 
|-id=027 bgcolor=#fefefe
| 205027 ||  || — || February 23, 1998 || Kitt Peak || Spacewatch || NYS || align=right data-sort-value="0.86" | 860 m || 
|-id=028 bgcolor=#d6d6d6
| 205028 ||  || — || March 1, 1998 || Caussols || ODAS || — || align=right | 4.7 km || 
|-id=029 bgcolor=#E9E9E9
| 205029 ||  || — || April 22, 1998 || Kitt Peak || Spacewatch || ADE || align=right | 2.7 km || 
|-id=030 bgcolor=#E9E9E9
| 205030 ||  || — || April 18, 1998 || Kitt Peak || Spacewatch || — || align=right | 1.5 km || 
|-id=031 bgcolor=#E9E9E9
| 205031 ||  || — || June 27, 1998 || Kitt Peak || Spacewatch || ADE || align=right | 3.9 km || 
|-id=032 bgcolor=#E9E9E9
| 205032 ||  || — || August 17, 1998 || Socorro || LINEAR || — || align=right | 2.5 km || 
|-id=033 bgcolor=#E9E9E9
| 205033 ||  || — || August 30, 1998 || Kitt Peak || Spacewatch || — || align=right | 2.2 km || 
|-id=034 bgcolor=#E9E9E9
| 205034 ||  || — || August 24, 1998 || Socorro || LINEAR || DOR || align=right | 4.7 km || 
|-id=035 bgcolor=#E9E9E9
| 205035 ||  || — || August 24, 1998 || Socorro || LINEAR || — || align=right | 3.0 km || 
|-id=036 bgcolor=#E9E9E9
| 205036 ||  || — || August 24, 1998 || Socorro || LINEAR || — || align=right | 3.4 km || 
|-id=037 bgcolor=#fefefe
| 205037 ||  || — || September 14, 1998 || Socorro || LINEAR || — || align=right | 1.1 km || 
|-id=038 bgcolor=#E9E9E9
| 205038 ||  || — || September 14, 1998 || Socorro || LINEAR || — || align=right | 2.4 km || 
|-id=039 bgcolor=#E9E9E9
| 205039 ||  || — || September 21, 1998 || Caussols || ODAS || DOR || align=right | 4.9 km || 
|-id=040 bgcolor=#E9E9E9
| 205040 ||  || — || September 26, 1998 || Kitt Peak || Spacewatch || HOF || align=right | 3.4 km || 
|-id=041 bgcolor=#E9E9E9
| 205041 ||  || — || September 26, 1998 || Socorro || LINEAR || MAR || align=right | 1.8 km || 
|-id=042 bgcolor=#E9E9E9
| 205042 ||  || — || September 26, 1998 || Socorro || LINEAR || — || align=right | 1.7 km || 
|-id=043 bgcolor=#E9E9E9
| 205043 ||  || — || September 26, 1998 || Socorro || LINEAR || RAF || align=right | 1.6 km || 
|-id=044 bgcolor=#E9E9E9
| 205044 ||  || — || October 13, 1998 || Kitt Peak || Spacewatch || — || align=right | 1.8 km || 
|-id=045 bgcolor=#E9E9E9
| 205045 ||  || — || October 13, 1998 || Kitt Peak || Spacewatch || — || align=right | 4.9 km || 
|-id=046 bgcolor=#d6d6d6
| 205046 ||  || — || October 16, 1998 || Kitt Peak || Spacewatch || — || align=right | 4.0 km || 
|-id=047 bgcolor=#E9E9E9
| 205047 ||  || — || October 18, 1998 || Anderson Mesa || LONEOS || — || align=right | 3.3 km || 
|-id=048 bgcolor=#E9E9E9
| 205048 ||  || — || November 16, 1998 || Kitt Peak || Spacewatch || HNA || align=right | 3.6 km || 
|-id=049 bgcolor=#fefefe
| 205049 ||  || — || November 23, 1998 || Kitt Peak || Spacewatch || — || align=right data-sort-value="0.95" | 950 m || 
|-id=050 bgcolor=#d6d6d6
| 205050 ||  || — || January 15, 1999 || Kitt Peak || Spacewatch || THM || align=right | 5.0 km || 
|-id=051 bgcolor=#fefefe
| 205051 ||  || — || February 10, 1999 || Socorro || LINEAR || — || align=right | 1.6 km || 
|-id=052 bgcolor=#d6d6d6
| 205052 ||  || — || February 10, 1999 || Kitt Peak || Spacewatch || KOR || align=right | 2.1 km || 
|-id=053 bgcolor=#d6d6d6
| 205053 ||  || — || February 10, 1999 || Kitt Peak || Spacewatch || — || align=right | 4.3 km || 
|-id=054 bgcolor=#fefefe
| 205054 ||  || — || March 16, 1999 || Kitt Peak || Spacewatch || V || align=right | 1.0 km || 
|-id=055 bgcolor=#d6d6d6
| 205055 ||  || — || April 6, 1999 || Anderson Mesa || LONEOS || — || align=right | 5.9 km || 
|-id=056 bgcolor=#d6d6d6
| 205056 ||  || — || May 8, 1999 || Catalina || CSS || TIR || align=right | 2.9 km || 
|-id=057 bgcolor=#fefefe
| 205057 ||  || — || May 10, 1999 || Socorro || LINEAR || — || align=right | 1.1 km || 
|-id=058 bgcolor=#fefefe
| 205058 ||  || — || May 12, 1999 || Socorro || LINEAR || — || align=right | 1.3 km || 
|-id=059 bgcolor=#fefefe
| 205059 ||  || — || May 10, 1999 || Socorro || LINEAR || — || align=right | 1.4 km || 
|-id=060 bgcolor=#d6d6d6
| 205060 ||  || — || June 8, 1999 || Socorro || LINEAR || — || align=right | 3.4 km || 
|-id=061 bgcolor=#E9E9E9
| 205061 ||  || — || September 7, 1999 || Socorro || LINEAR || — || align=right | 1.3 km || 
|-id=062 bgcolor=#d6d6d6
| 205062 ||  || — || September 8, 1999 || Socorro || LINEAR || Tj (2.92) || align=right | 5.5 km || 
|-id=063 bgcolor=#E9E9E9
| 205063 ||  || — || September 13, 1999 || Kleť || Kleť Obs. || ADE || align=right | 4.0 km || 
|-id=064 bgcolor=#E9E9E9
| 205064 ||  || — || September 7, 1999 || Socorro || LINEAR || — || align=right | 2.3 km || 
|-id=065 bgcolor=#fefefe
| 205065 ||  || — || September 7, 1999 || Socorro || LINEAR || — || align=right | 1.5 km || 
|-id=066 bgcolor=#fefefe
| 205066 ||  || — || September 7, 1999 || Socorro || LINEAR || — || align=right | 1.7 km || 
|-id=067 bgcolor=#E9E9E9
| 205067 ||  || — || September 7, 1999 || Socorro || LINEAR || — || align=right | 1.9 km || 
|-id=068 bgcolor=#E9E9E9
| 205068 ||  || — || September 7, 1999 || Socorro || LINEAR || — || align=right | 2.1 km || 
|-id=069 bgcolor=#E9E9E9
| 205069 ||  || — || September 8, 1999 || Socorro || LINEAR || — || align=right | 3.3 km || 
|-id=070 bgcolor=#d6d6d6
| 205070 ||  || — || September 8, 1999 || Socorro || LINEAR || Tj (2.94) || align=right | 9.9 km || 
|-id=071 bgcolor=#E9E9E9
| 205071 ||  || — || September 8, 1999 || Socorro || LINEAR || — || align=right | 2.9 km || 
|-id=072 bgcolor=#fefefe
| 205072 ||  || — || September 9, 1999 || Socorro || LINEAR || NYS || align=right | 3.3 km || 
|-id=073 bgcolor=#E9E9E9
| 205073 ||  || — || September 9, 1999 || Socorro || LINEAR || — || align=right | 3.4 km || 
|-id=074 bgcolor=#fefefe
| 205074 ||  || — || September 13, 1999 || Bergisch Gladbach || W. Bickel || — || align=right | 1.0 km || 
|-id=075 bgcolor=#E9E9E9
| 205075 ||  || — || September 5, 1999 || Anderson Mesa || LONEOS || — || align=right | 1.6 km || 
|-id=076 bgcolor=#E9E9E9
| 205076 ||  || — || September 8, 1999 || Catalina || CSS || — || align=right | 1.7 km || 
|-id=077 bgcolor=#E9E9E9
| 205077 ||  || — || September 7, 1999 || Anderson Mesa || LONEOS || — || align=right | 3.7 km || 
|-id=078 bgcolor=#E9E9E9
| 205078 ||  || — || September 16, 1999 || Uccle || T. Pauwels, S. I. Ipatov || — || align=right data-sort-value="0.95" | 950 m || 
|-id=079 bgcolor=#E9E9E9
| 205079 ||  || — || September 30, 1999 || Catalina || CSS || — || align=right | 1.6 km || 
|-id=080 bgcolor=#E9E9E9
| 205080 ||  || — || September 30, 1999 || Socorro || LINEAR || — || align=right | 1.8 km || 
|-id=081 bgcolor=#E9E9E9
| 205081 ||  || — || October 12, 1999 || Fountain Hills || C. W. Juels || — || align=right | 3.2 km || 
|-id=082 bgcolor=#E9E9E9
| 205082 ||  || — || October 12, 1999 || Ondřejov || P. Kušnirák, P. Pravec || — || align=right data-sort-value="0.84" | 840 m || 
|-id=083 bgcolor=#E9E9E9
| 205083 ||  || — || October 3, 1999 || Kitt Peak || Spacewatch || — || align=right | 1.2 km || 
|-id=084 bgcolor=#E9E9E9
| 205084 ||  || — || October 3, 1999 || Kitt Peak || Spacewatch || — || align=right | 1.1 km || 
|-id=085 bgcolor=#E9E9E9
| 205085 ||  || — || October 4, 1999 || Socorro || LINEAR || — || align=right | 2.2 km || 
|-id=086 bgcolor=#E9E9E9
| 205086 ||  || — || October 4, 1999 || Socorro || LINEAR || — || align=right | 1.9 km || 
|-id=087 bgcolor=#fefefe
| 205087 ||  || — || October 8, 1999 || Kitt Peak || Spacewatch || MAS || align=right | 1.3 km || 
|-id=088 bgcolor=#E9E9E9
| 205088 ||  || — || October 12, 1999 || Kitt Peak || Spacewatch || — || align=right | 1.7 km || 
|-id=089 bgcolor=#E9E9E9
| 205089 ||  || — || October 6, 1999 || Socorro || LINEAR || — || align=right | 1.0 km || 
|-id=090 bgcolor=#E9E9E9
| 205090 ||  || — || October 6, 1999 || Socorro || LINEAR || — || align=right | 2.0 km || 
|-id=091 bgcolor=#E9E9E9
| 205091 ||  || — || October 6, 1999 || Socorro || LINEAR || — || align=right | 1.2 km || 
|-id=092 bgcolor=#E9E9E9
| 205092 ||  || — || October 7, 1999 || Socorro || LINEAR || — || align=right | 1.4 km || 
|-id=093 bgcolor=#E9E9E9
| 205093 ||  || — || October 9, 1999 || Socorro || LINEAR || — || align=right | 4.3 km || 
|-id=094 bgcolor=#E9E9E9
| 205094 ||  || — || October 9, 1999 || Socorro || LINEAR || — || align=right | 1.9 km || 
|-id=095 bgcolor=#E9E9E9
| 205095 ||  || — || October 10, 1999 || Socorro || LINEAR || — || align=right | 1.7 km || 
|-id=096 bgcolor=#E9E9E9
| 205096 ||  || — || October 10, 1999 || Socorro || LINEAR || — || align=right | 1.6 km || 
|-id=097 bgcolor=#E9E9E9
| 205097 ||  || — || October 10, 1999 || Socorro || LINEAR || — || align=right | 2.1 km || 
|-id=098 bgcolor=#E9E9E9
| 205098 ||  || — || October 10, 1999 || Socorro || LINEAR || — || align=right | 1.1 km || 
|-id=099 bgcolor=#E9E9E9
| 205099 ||  || — || October 14, 1999 || Socorro || LINEAR || CLO || align=right | 3.1 km || 
|-id=100 bgcolor=#E9E9E9
| 205100 ||  || — || October 15, 1999 || Socorro || LINEAR || — || align=right | 1.1 km || 
|}

205101–205200 

|-bgcolor=#E9E9E9
| 205101 ||  || — || October 15, 1999 || Socorro || LINEAR || — || align=right | 2.3 km || 
|-id=102 bgcolor=#E9E9E9
| 205102 ||  || — || October 3, 1999 || Catalina || CSS || ADE || align=right | 3.5 km || 
|-id=103 bgcolor=#fefefe
| 205103 ||  || — || October 3, 1999 || Kitt Peak || Spacewatch || — || align=right | 1.3 km || 
|-id=104 bgcolor=#d6d6d6
| 205104 ||  || — || October 1, 1999 || Kitt Peak || Spacewatch || 3:2 || align=right | 4.6 km || 
|-id=105 bgcolor=#E9E9E9
| 205105 ||  || — || October 3, 1999 || Kitt Peak || Spacewatch || — || align=right | 1.8 km || 
|-id=106 bgcolor=#fefefe
| 205106 ||  || — || October 11, 1999 || Kitt Peak || Spacewatch || — || align=right | 2.2 km || 
|-id=107 bgcolor=#E9E9E9
| 205107 ||  || — || October 3, 1999 || Socorro || LINEAR || — || align=right | 1.7 km || 
|-id=108 bgcolor=#E9E9E9
| 205108 ||  || — || October 7, 1999 || Socorro || LINEAR || — || align=right | 1.7 km || 
|-id=109 bgcolor=#E9E9E9
| 205109 ||  || — || October 31, 1999 || Kitt Peak || Spacewatch || — || align=right | 1.8 km || 
|-id=110 bgcolor=#E9E9E9
| 205110 ||  || — || October 31, 1999 || Kitt Peak || Spacewatch || — || align=right data-sort-value="0.91" | 910 m || 
|-id=111 bgcolor=#fefefe
| 205111 ||  || — || October 16, 1999 || Kitt Peak || Spacewatch || NYS || align=right | 1.2 km || 
|-id=112 bgcolor=#E9E9E9
| 205112 ||  || — || October 31, 1999 || Catalina || CSS || RAF || align=right | 1.5 km || 
|-id=113 bgcolor=#E9E9E9
| 205113 ||  || — || November 1, 1999 || Catalina || CSS || — || align=right | 3.3 km || 
|-id=114 bgcolor=#E9E9E9
| 205114 ||  || — || November 8, 1999 || Oizumi || T. Kobayashi || — || align=right | 3.1 km || 
|-id=115 bgcolor=#E9E9E9
| 205115 ||  || — || November 2, 1999 || Kitt Peak || Spacewatch || — || align=right | 1.6 km || 
|-id=116 bgcolor=#E9E9E9
| 205116 ||  || — || November 12, 1999 || Višnjan Observatory || K. Korlević || — || align=right | 2.2 km || 
|-id=117 bgcolor=#E9E9E9
| 205117 ||  || — || November 4, 1999 || Kitt Peak || Spacewatch || — || align=right | 1.8 km || 
|-id=118 bgcolor=#E9E9E9
| 205118 ||  || — || November 4, 1999 || Socorro || LINEAR || JUN || align=right | 1.6 km || 
|-id=119 bgcolor=#E9E9E9
| 205119 ||  || — || November 4, 1999 || Socorro || LINEAR || — || align=right | 1.9 km || 
|-id=120 bgcolor=#E9E9E9
| 205120 ||  || — || November 5, 1999 || Socorro || LINEAR || — || align=right | 2.6 km || 
|-id=121 bgcolor=#E9E9E9
| 205121 ||  || — || November 2, 1999 || Kitt Peak || Spacewatch || — || align=right | 4.6 km || 
|-id=122 bgcolor=#E9E9E9
| 205122 ||  || — || November 9, 1999 || Socorro || LINEAR || — || align=right | 3.8 km || 
|-id=123 bgcolor=#E9E9E9
| 205123 ||  || — || November 9, 1999 || Socorro || LINEAR || — || align=right | 2.3 km || 
|-id=124 bgcolor=#E9E9E9
| 205124 ||  || — || November 9, 1999 || Socorro || LINEAR || — || align=right | 1.5 km || 
|-id=125 bgcolor=#E9E9E9
| 205125 ||  || — || November 9, 1999 || Socorro || LINEAR || HEN || align=right | 1.6 km || 
|-id=126 bgcolor=#E9E9E9
| 205126 ||  || — || November 11, 1999 || Kitt Peak || Spacewatch || — || align=right | 1.1 km || 
|-id=127 bgcolor=#E9E9E9
| 205127 ||  || — || November 12, 1999 || Socorro || LINEAR || — || align=right | 1.4 km || 
|-id=128 bgcolor=#E9E9E9
| 205128 ||  || — || November 10, 1999 || Kitt Peak || Spacewatch || — || align=right | 2.4 km || 
|-id=129 bgcolor=#fefefe
| 205129 ||  || — || November 14, 1999 || Socorro || LINEAR || — || align=right | 2.3 km || 
|-id=130 bgcolor=#E9E9E9
| 205130 ||  || — || November 14, 1999 || Socorro || LINEAR || — || align=right | 1.3 km || 
|-id=131 bgcolor=#E9E9E9
| 205131 ||  || — || November 14, 1999 || Socorro || LINEAR || — || align=right | 1.8 km || 
|-id=132 bgcolor=#E9E9E9
| 205132 ||  || — || November 14, 1999 || Socorro || LINEAR || — || align=right | 1.8 km || 
|-id=133 bgcolor=#E9E9E9
| 205133 ||  || — || November 14, 1999 || Socorro || LINEAR || — || align=right | 1.9 km || 
|-id=134 bgcolor=#d6d6d6
| 205134 ||  || — || November 9, 1999 || Socorro || LINEAR || SHU3:2 || align=right | 6.4 km || 
|-id=135 bgcolor=#E9E9E9
| 205135 ||  || — || November 12, 1999 || Socorro || LINEAR || — || align=right | 4.3 km || 
|-id=136 bgcolor=#E9E9E9
| 205136 ||  || — || November 1, 1999 || Kitt Peak || Spacewatch || — || align=right | 1.9 km || 
|-id=137 bgcolor=#E9E9E9
| 205137 ||  || — || November 3, 1999 || Catalina || CSS || — || align=right | 2.7 km || 
|-id=138 bgcolor=#E9E9E9
| 205138 ||  || — || November 3, 1999 || Socorro || LINEAR || — || align=right | 2.3 km || 
|-id=139 bgcolor=#E9E9E9
| 205139 ||  || — || November 3, 1999 || Kitt Peak || Spacewatch || — || align=right | 1.3 km || 
|-id=140 bgcolor=#E9E9E9
| 205140 ||  || — || November 30, 1999 || Kitt Peak || Spacewatch || — || align=right | 2.0 km || 
|-id=141 bgcolor=#E9E9E9
| 205141 ||  || — || November 28, 1999 || Kitt Peak || Spacewatch || AST || align=right | 2.9 km || 
|-id=142 bgcolor=#E9E9E9
| 205142 ||  || — || November 29, 1999 || Kitt Peak || Spacewatch || — || align=right data-sort-value="0.98" | 980 m || 
|-id=143 bgcolor=#E9E9E9
| 205143 ||  || — || November 30, 1999 || Kitt Peak || Spacewatch || — || align=right | 1.9 km || 
|-id=144 bgcolor=#E9E9E9
| 205144 ||  || — || December 5, 1999 || Kitt Peak || Spacewatch || — || align=right | 1.4 km || 
|-id=145 bgcolor=#E9E9E9
| 205145 ||  || — || December 6, 1999 || Višnjan Observatory || K. Korlević || — || align=right | 3.2 km || 
|-id=146 bgcolor=#E9E9E9
| 205146 ||  || — || December 7, 1999 || Socorro || LINEAR || — || align=right | 3.4 km || 
|-id=147 bgcolor=#E9E9E9
| 205147 ||  || — || December 7, 1999 || Socorro || LINEAR || — || align=right | 2.0 km || 
|-id=148 bgcolor=#E9E9E9
| 205148 ||  || — || December 7, 1999 || Socorro || LINEAR || — || align=right | 3.0 km || 
|-id=149 bgcolor=#E9E9E9
| 205149 ||  || — || December 5, 1999 || Catalina || CSS || — || align=right | 2.5 km || 
|-id=150 bgcolor=#E9E9E9
| 205150 ||  || — || December 7, 1999 || Catalina || CSS || — || align=right | 1.6 km || 
|-id=151 bgcolor=#E9E9E9
| 205151 ||  || — || December 7, 1999 || Kitt Peak || Spacewatch || — || align=right | 1.1 km || 
|-id=152 bgcolor=#E9E9E9
| 205152 ||  || — || December 8, 1999 || Socorro || LINEAR || — || align=right | 2.5 km || 
|-id=153 bgcolor=#E9E9E9
| 205153 ||  || — || December 12, 1999 || Socorro || LINEAR || IAN || align=right | 1.3 km || 
|-id=154 bgcolor=#E9E9E9
| 205154 ||  || — || December 12, 1999 || Socorro || LINEAR || JUN || align=right | 1.9 km || 
|-id=155 bgcolor=#E9E9E9
| 205155 ||  || — || December 12, 1999 || Socorro || LINEAR || — || align=right | 2.1 km || 
|-id=156 bgcolor=#E9E9E9
| 205156 ||  || — || December 12, 1999 || Socorro || LINEAR || — || align=right | 3.4 km || 
|-id=157 bgcolor=#E9E9E9
| 205157 ||  || — || December 13, 1999 || Kitt Peak || Spacewatch || — || align=right | 2.9 km || 
|-id=158 bgcolor=#E9E9E9
| 205158 ||  || — || December 3, 1999 || Anderson Mesa || LONEOS || — || align=right | 1.6 km || 
|-id=159 bgcolor=#E9E9E9
| 205159 ||  || — || December 4, 1999 || Catalina || CSS || — || align=right | 1.9 km || 
|-id=160 bgcolor=#E9E9E9
| 205160 ||  || — || December 5, 1999 || Catalina || CSS || — || align=right | 1.7 km || 
|-id=161 bgcolor=#E9E9E9
| 205161 ||  || — || December 12, 1999 || Kitt Peak || Spacewatch || HNA || align=right | 2.3 km || 
|-id=162 bgcolor=#E9E9E9
| 205162 ||  || — || January 5, 2000 || Kitt Peak || Spacewatch || WIT || align=right | 1.5 km || 
|-id=163 bgcolor=#E9E9E9
| 205163 ||  || — || January 3, 2000 || Socorro || LINEAR || — || align=right | 6.9 km || 
|-id=164 bgcolor=#E9E9E9
| 205164 ||  || — || January 4, 2000 || Socorro || LINEAR || — || align=right | 1.7 km || 
|-id=165 bgcolor=#E9E9E9
| 205165 ||  || — || January 7, 2000 || Socorro || LINEAR || PAE || align=right | 5.8 km || 
|-id=166 bgcolor=#E9E9E9
| 205166 ||  || — || January 13, 2000 || Kleť || Kleť Obs. || — || align=right | 2.9 km || 
|-id=167 bgcolor=#E9E9E9
| 205167 ||  || — || January 8, 2000 || Socorro || LINEAR || — || align=right | 3.9 km || 
|-id=168 bgcolor=#E9E9E9
| 205168 ||  || — || January 6, 2000 || Kitt Peak || Spacewatch || — || align=right | 5.1 km || 
|-id=169 bgcolor=#E9E9E9
| 205169 ||  || — || January 7, 2000 || Kitt Peak || Spacewatch || — || align=right | 2.4 km || 
|-id=170 bgcolor=#E9E9E9
| 205170 ||  || — || January 8, 2000 || Kitt Peak || Spacewatch || — || align=right | 2.2 km || 
|-id=171 bgcolor=#E9E9E9
| 205171 ||  || — || January 4, 2000 || Socorro || LINEAR || — || align=right | 1.7 km || 
|-id=172 bgcolor=#E9E9E9
| 205172 ||  || — || January 4, 2000 || Socorro || LINEAR || — || align=right | 2.5 km || 
|-id=173 bgcolor=#E9E9E9
| 205173 ||  || — || January 6, 2000 || Socorro || LINEAR || — || align=right | 3.6 km || 
|-id=174 bgcolor=#E9E9E9
| 205174 || 2000 BO || — || January 16, 2000 || Višnjan Observatory || K. Korlević || — || align=right | 2.9 km || 
|-id=175 bgcolor=#E9E9E9
| 205175 ||  || — || January 27, 2000 || Socorro || LINEAR || — || align=right | 2.6 km || 
|-id=176 bgcolor=#E9E9E9
| 205176 ||  || — || January 29, 2000 || Kitt Peak || Spacewatch || — || align=right | 3.6 km || 
|-id=177 bgcolor=#E9E9E9
| 205177 ||  || — || February 2, 2000 || Socorro || LINEAR || — || align=right | 3.5 km || 
|-id=178 bgcolor=#E9E9E9
| 205178 ||  || — || February 2, 2000 || Socorro || LINEAR || — || align=right | 2.3 km || 
|-id=179 bgcolor=#E9E9E9
| 205179 ||  || — || February 2, 2000 || Socorro || LINEAR || — || align=right | 4.4 km || 
|-id=180 bgcolor=#E9E9E9
| 205180 ||  || — || February 7, 2000 || Kitt Peak || Spacewatch || — || align=right | 3.0 km || 
|-id=181 bgcolor=#E9E9E9
| 205181 ||  || — || February 4, 2000 || Socorro || LINEAR || VIB || align=right | 3.4 km || 
|-id=182 bgcolor=#E9E9E9
| 205182 ||  || — || February 6, 2000 || Socorro || LINEAR || — || align=right | 4.0 km || 
|-id=183 bgcolor=#E9E9E9
| 205183 ||  || — || February 10, 2000 || Kitt Peak || Spacewatch || — || align=right | 2.7 km || 
|-id=184 bgcolor=#E9E9E9
| 205184 ||  || — || February 28, 2000 || Socorro || LINEAR || — || align=right | 4.3 km || 
|-id=185 bgcolor=#E9E9E9
| 205185 ||  || — || February 28, 2000 || Socorro || LINEAR || — || align=right | 4.7 km || 
|-id=186 bgcolor=#E9E9E9
| 205186 ||  || — || February 26, 2000 || Kitt Peak || Spacewatch || HOF || align=right | 3.0 km || 
|-id=187 bgcolor=#E9E9E9
| 205187 ||  || — || February 29, 2000 || Socorro || LINEAR || HNS || align=right | 2.1 km || 
|-id=188 bgcolor=#E9E9E9
| 205188 ||  || — || February 29, 2000 || Socorro || LINEAR || — || align=right | 2.7 km || 
|-id=189 bgcolor=#E9E9E9
| 205189 ||  || — || February 29, 2000 || Socorro || LINEAR || — || align=right | 3.0 km || 
|-id=190 bgcolor=#E9E9E9
| 205190 ||  || — || February 29, 2000 || Socorro || LINEAR || — || align=right | 2.8 km || 
|-id=191 bgcolor=#E9E9E9
| 205191 ||  || — || February 29, 2000 || Socorro || LINEAR || AGN || align=right | 1.7 km || 
|-id=192 bgcolor=#E9E9E9
| 205192 ||  || — || February 29, 2000 || Socorro || LINEAR || — || align=right | 2.6 km || 
|-id=193 bgcolor=#E9E9E9
| 205193 ||  || — || February 29, 2000 || Socorro || LINEAR || — || align=right | 3.7 km || 
|-id=194 bgcolor=#E9E9E9
| 205194 ||  || — || March 2, 2000 || Kitt Peak || Spacewatch || — || align=right | 3.9 km || 
|-id=195 bgcolor=#E9E9E9
| 205195 ||  || — || March 8, 2000 || Socorro || LINEAR || — || align=right | 4.4 km || 
|-id=196 bgcolor=#E9E9E9
| 205196 ||  || — || March 9, 2000 || Kitt Peak || Spacewatch || HOF || align=right | 4.3 km || 
|-id=197 bgcolor=#E9E9E9
| 205197 ||  || — || March 5, 2000 || Socorro || LINEAR || INO || align=right | 1.7 km || 
|-id=198 bgcolor=#E9E9E9
| 205198 ||  || — || March 10, 2000 || Kitt Peak || Spacewatch || — || align=right | 2.8 km || 
|-id=199 bgcolor=#E9E9E9
| 205199 ||  || — || March 10, 2000 || Socorro || LINEAR || — || align=right | 4.6 km || 
|-id=200 bgcolor=#E9E9E9
| 205200 ||  || — || March 11, 2000 || Socorro || LINEAR || XIZ || align=right | 2.0 km || 
|}

205201–205300 

|-bgcolor=#E9E9E9
| 205201 ||  || — || March 11, 2000 || Socorro || LINEAR || — || align=right | 2.7 km || 
|-id=202 bgcolor=#E9E9E9
| 205202 ||  || — || March 3, 2000 || Socorro || LINEAR || — || align=right | 2.7 km || 
|-id=203 bgcolor=#E9E9E9
| 205203 ||  || — || March 6, 2000 || Haleakala || NEAT || — || align=right | 3.6 km || 
|-id=204 bgcolor=#E9E9E9
| 205204 ||  || — || March 4, 2000 || Socorro || LINEAR || — || align=right | 2.3 km || 
|-id=205 bgcolor=#d6d6d6
| 205205 ||  || — || March 26, 2000 || Prescott || P. G. Comba || KOR || align=right | 2.7 km || 
|-id=206 bgcolor=#E9E9E9
| 205206 ||  || — || April 5, 2000 || Socorro || LINEAR || — || align=right | 4.4 km || 
|-id=207 bgcolor=#E9E9E9
| 205207 ||  || — || April 5, 2000 || Socorro || LINEAR || — || align=right | 3.5 km || 
|-id=208 bgcolor=#d6d6d6
| 205208 ||  || — || April 5, 2000 || Socorro || LINEAR || — || align=right | 4.3 km || 
|-id=209 bgcolor=#d6d6d6
| 205209 ||  || — || April 5, 2000 || Socorro || LINEAR || CHA || align=right | 2.6 km || 
|-id=210 bgcolor=#E9E9E9
| 205210 ||  || — || April 4, 2000 || Socorro || LINEAR || — || align=right | 4.3 km || 
|-id=211 bgcolor=#E9E9E9
| 205211 ||  || — || April 7, 2000 || Socorro || LINEAR || — || align=right | 4.6 km || 
|-id=212 bgcolor=#fefefe
| 205212 ||  || — || April 27, 2000 || Socorro || LINEAR || — || align=right | 2.8 km || 
|-id=213 bgcolor=#fefefe
| 205213 ||  || — || April 29, 2000 || Socorro || LINEAR || — || align=right | 1.5 km || 
|-id=214 bgcolor=#d6d6d6
| 205214 ||  || — || May 4, 2000 || Kitt Peak || Spacewatch || — || align=right | 3.0 km || 
|-id=215 bgcolor=#E9E9E9
| 205215 ||  || — || May 4, 2000 || Apache Point || SDSS || — || align=right | 3.7 km || 
|-id=216 bgcolor=#d6d6d6
| 205216 ||  || — || June 27, 2000 || Bergisch Gladbach || W. Bickel || — || align=right | 3.4 km || 
|-id=217 bgcolor=#d6d6d6
| 205217 ||  || — || July 30, 2000 || Socorro || LINEAR || EUP || align=right | 7.1 km || 
|-id=218 bgcolor=#fefefe
| 205218 ||  || — || July 30, 2000 || Socorro || LINEAR || PHO || align=right | 2.3 km || 
|-id=219 bgcolor=#fefefe
| 205219 ||  || — || July 29, 2000 || Anderson Mesa || LONEOS || — || align=right | 1.6 km || 
|-id=220 bgcolor=#d6d6d6
| 205220 ||  || — || August 5, 2000 || Prescott || P. G. Comba || HYG || align=right | 4.2 km || 
|-id=221 bgcolor=#fefefe
| 205221 ||  || — || August 26, 2000 || Socorro || LINEAR || — || align=right | 1.6 km || 
|-id=222 bgcolor=#fefefe
| 205222 ||  || — || August 24, 2000 || Socorro || LINEAR || — || align=right | 1.6 km || 
|-id=223 bgcolor=#d6d6d6
| 205223 ||  || — || August 24, 2000 || Socorro || LINEAR || — || align=right | 4.8 km || 
|-id=224 bgcolor=#fefefe
| 205224 ||  || — || August 25, 2000 || Socorro || LINEAR || — || align=right | 1.6 km || 
|-id=225 bgcolor=#fefefe
| 205225 ||  || — || August 26, 2000 || Socorro || LINEAR || V || align=right data-sort-value="0.98" | 980 m || 
|-id=226 bgcolor=#fefefe
| 205226 ||  || — || August 24, 2000 || Socorro || LINEAR || NYS || align=right | 2.1 km || 
|-id=227 bgcolor=#d6d6d6
| 205227 ||  || — || August 24, 2000 || Socorro || LINEAR || VER || align=right | 4.0 km || 
|-id=228 bgcolor=#fefefe
| 205228 ||  || — || August 28, 2000 || Socorro || LINEAR || — || align=right | 1.5 km || 
|-id=229 bgcolor=#fefefe
| 205229 ||  || — || August 28, 2000 || Socorro || LINEAR || — || align=right | 1.8 km || 
|-id=230 bgcolor=#fefefe
| 205230 ||  || — || August 28, 2000 || Socorro || LINEAR || NYS || align=right | 1.1 km || 
|-id=231 bgcolor=#fefefe
| 205231 ||  || — || August 24, 2000 || Socorro || LINEAR || FLO || align=right data-sort-value="0.68" | 680 m || 
|-id=232 bgcolor=#fefefe
| 205232 ||  || — || August 25, 2000 || Socorro || LINEAR || — || align=right | 1.2 km || 
|-id=233 bgcolor=#fefefe
| 205233 ||  || — || August 25, 2000 || Socorro || LINEAR || FLO || align=right | 1.2 km || 
|-id=234 bgcolor=#fefefe
| 205234 ||  || — || August 25, 2000 || Socorro || LINEAR || — || align=right | 1.3 km || 
|-id=235 bgcolor=#fefefe
| 205235 ||  || — || August 31, 2000 || Socorro || LINEAR || NYS || align=right | 1.0 km || 
|-id=236 bgcolor=#fefefe
| 205236 ||  || — || August 24, 2000 || Socorro || LINEAR || FLO || align=right | 1.5 km || 
|-id=237 bgcolor=#fefefe
| 205237 ||  || — || August 31, 2000 || Socorro || LINEAR || V || align=right data-sort-value="0.94" | 940 m || 
|-id=238 bgcolor=#fefefe
| 205238 ||  || — || August 31, 2000 || Socorro || LINEAR || — || align=right | 1.3 km || 
|-id=239 bgcolor=#fefefe
| 205239 ||  || — || August 31, 2000 || Socorro || LINEAR || V || align=right | 1.0 km || 
|-id=240 bgcolor=#fefefe
| 205240 ||  || — || August 31, 2000 || Socorro || LINEAR || ERI || align=right | 1.8 km || 
|-id=241 bgcolor=#fefefe
| 205241 ||  || — || August 31, 2000 || Socorro || LINEAR || NYS || align=right | 2.7 km || 
|-id=242 bgcolor=#fefefe
| 205242 ||  || — || August 26, 2000 || Socorro || LINEAR || — || align=right | 1.9 km || 
|-id=243 bgcolor=#fefefe
| 205243 ||  || — || August 26, 2000 || Socorro || LINEAR || — || align=right | 1.7 km || 
|-id=244 bgcolor=#fefefe
| 205244 ||  || — || August 26, 2000 || Socorro || LINEAR || V || align=right | 1.5 km || 
|-id=245 bgcolor=#fefefe
| 205245 ||  || — || August 26, 2000 || Socorro || LINEAR || — || align=right | 1.1 km || 
|-id=246 bgcolor=#fefefe
| 205246 ||  || — || August 29, 2000 || Socorro || LINEAR || NYS || align=right | 1.1 km || 
|-id=247 bgcolor=#fefefe
| 205247 ||  || — || August 29, 2000 || Socorro || LINEAR || NYS || align=right | 2.3 km || 
|-id=248 bgcolor=#d6d6d6
| 205248 ||  || — || August 29, 2000 || Socorro || LINEAR || — || align=right | 5.5 km || 
|-id=249 bgcolor=#fefefe
| 205249 ||  || — || August 31, 2000 || Socorro || LINEAR || NYS || align=right data-sort-value="0.88" | 880 m || 
|-id=250 bgcolor=#fefefe
| 205250 ||  || — || August 31, 2000 || Socorro || LINEAR || MAS || align=right | 1.0 km || 
|-id=251 bgcolor=#fefefe
| 205251 ||  || — || August 31, 2000 || Socorro || LINEAR || — || align=right | 1.1 km || 
|-id=252 bgcolor=#fefefe
| 205252 ||  || — || August 21, 2000 || Anderson Mesa || LONEOS || — || align=right | 1.5 km || 
|-id=253 bgcolor=#fefefe
| 205253 ||  || — || September 3, 2000 || Socorro || LINEAR || — || align=right | 1.6 km || 
|-id=254 bgcolor=#fefefe
| 205254 ||  || — || September 3, 2000 || Socorro || LINEAR || — || align=right | 1.8 km || 
|-id=255 bgcolor=#fefefe
| 205255 ||  || — || September 3, 2000 || Socorro || LINEAR || — || align=right | 1.7 km || 
|-id=256 bgcolor=#fefefe
| 205256 ||  || — || September 8, 2000 || Kitt Peak || Spacewatch || — || align=right | 1.3 km || 
|-id=257 bgcolor=#fefefe
| 205257 ||  || — || September 9, 2000 || Kleť || Kleť Obs. || — || align=right | 1.2 km || 
|-id=258 bgcolor=#fefefe
| 205258 ||  || — || September 1, 2000 || Socorro || LINEAR || — || align=right | 1.1 km || 
|-id=259 bgcolor=#fefefe
| 205259 ||  || — || September 3, 2000 || Socorro || LINEAR || ERI || align=right | 3.6 km || 
|-id=260 bgcolor=#fefefe
| 205260 ||  || — || September 4, 2000 || Anderson Mesa || LONEOS || — || align=right data-sort-value="0.97" | 970 m || 
|-id=261 bgcolor=#fefefe
| 205261 ||  || — || September 5, 2000 || Anderson Mesa || LONEOS || — || align=right | 2.7 km || 
|-id=262 bgcolor=#fefefe
| 205262 ||  || — || September 23, 2000 || Socorro || LINEAR || V || align=right | 1.1 km || 
|-id=263 bgcolor=#fefefe
| 205263 ||  || — || September 24, 2000 || Socorro || LINEAR || — || align=right | 1.3 km || 
|-id=264 bgcolor=#fefefe
| 205264 ||  || — || September 24, 2000 || Socorro || LINEAR || — || align=right | 1.2 km || 
|-id=265 bgcolor=#fefefe
| 205265 ||  || — || September 24, 2000 || Socorro || LINEAR || — || align=right | 1.4 km || 
|-id=266 bgcolor=#fefefe
| 205266 ||  || — || September 23, 2000 || Socorro || LINEAR || — || align=right data-sort-value="0.98" | 980 m || 
|-id=267 bgcolor=#fefefe
| 205267 ||  || — || September 24, 2000 || Socorro || LINEAR || — || align=right | 1.5 km || 
|-id=268 bgcolor=#fefefe
| 205268 ||  || — || September 24, 2000 || Socorro || LINEAR || MAS || align=right data-sort-value="0.97" | 970 m || 
|-id=269 bgcolor=#fefefe
| 205269 ||  || — || September 24, 2000 || Socorro || LINEAR || NYS || align=right data-sort-value="0.98" | 980 m || 
|-id=270 bgcolor=#fefefe
| 205270 ||  || — || September 24, 2000 || Socorro || LINEAR || V || align=right | 1.0 km || 
|-id=271 bgcolor=#fefefe
| 205271 ||  || — || September 24, 2000 || Socorro || LINEAR || — || align=right | 1.7 km || 
|-id=272 bgcolor=#fefefe
| 205272 ||  || — || September 24, 2000 || Socorro || LINEAR || NYS || align=right data-sort-value="0.98" | 980 m || 
|-id=273 bgcolor=#fefefe
| 205273 ||  || — || September 24, 2000 || Socorro || LINEAR || — || align=right | 1.1 km || 
|-id=274 bgcolor=#fefefe
| 205274 ||  || — || September 24, 2000 || Socorro || LINEAR || FLO || align=right | 1.3 km || 
|-id=275 bgcolor=#fefefe
| 205275 ||  || — || September 23, 2000 || Socorro || LINEAR || V || align=right | 1.2 km || 
|-id=276 bgcolor=#fefefe
| 205276 ||  || — || September 23, 2000 || Socorro || LINEAR || — || align=right | 1.0 km || 
|-id=277 bgcolor=#fefefe
| 205277 ||  || — || September 24, 2000 || Socorro || LINEAR || NYS || align=right data-sort-value="0.97" | 970 m || 
|-id=278 bgcolor=#fefefe
| 205278 ||  || — || September 24, 2000 || Socorro || LINEAR || — || align=right | 1.3 km || 
|-id=279 bgcolor=#fefefe
| 205279 ||  || — || September 24, 2000 || Socorro || LINEAR || — || align=right | 1.2 km || 
|-id=280 bgcolor=#fefefe
| 205280 ||  || — || September 24, 2000 || Socorro || LINEAR || — || align=right | 1.5 km || 
|-id=281 bgcolor=#fefefe
| 205281 ||  || — || September 23, 2000 || Socorro || LINEAR || — || align=right | 1.8 km || 
|-id=282 bgcolor=#fefefe
| 205282 ||  || — || September 23, 2000 || Socorro || LINEAR || V || align=right | 1.2 km || 
|-id=283 bgcolor=#fefefe
| 205283 ||  || — || September 24, 2000 || Socorro || LINEAR || NYS || align=right data-sort-value="0.83" | 830 m || 
|-id=284 bgcolor=#FA8072
| 205284 ||  || — || September 24, 2000 || Socorro || LINEAR || — || align=right | 1.2 km || 
|-id=285 bgcolor=#fefefe
| 205285 ||  || — || September 24, 2000 || Socorro || LINEAR || NYS || align=right data-sort-value="0.88" | 880 m || 
|-id=286 bgcolor=#fefefe
| 205286 ||  || — || September 23, 2000 || Socorro || LINEAR || V || align=right | 1.0 km || 
|-id=287 bgcolor=#d6d6d6
| 205287 ||  || — || September 28, 2000 || Socorro || LINEAR || 7:4 || align=right | 6.2 km || 
|-id=288 bgcolor=#fefefe
| 205288 ||  || — || September 24, 2000 || Socorro || LINEAR || NYS || align=right | 1.1 km || 
|-id=289 bgcolor=#fefefe
| 205289 ||  || — || September 25, 2000 || Socorro || LINEAR || — || align=right | 3.3 km || 
|-id=290 bgcolor=#fefefe
| 205290 ||  || — || September 25, 2000 || Socorro || LINEAR || — || align=right | 1.2 km || 
|-id=291 bgcolor=#fefefe
| 205291 ||  || — || September 25, 2000 || Socorro || LINEAR || — || align=right | 1.3 km || 
|-id=292 bgcolor=#fefefe
| 205292 ||  || — || September 28, 2000 || Socorro || LINEAR || — || align=right | 1.4 km || 
|-id=293 bgcolor=#fefefe
| 205293 ||  || — || September 24, 2000 || Socorro || LINEAR || — || align=right | 1.3 km || 
|-id=294 bgcolor=#fefefe
| 205294 ||  || — || September 24, 2000 || Socorro || LINEAR || V || align=right data-sort-value="0.96" | 960 m || 
|-id=295 bgcolor=#fefefe
| 205295 ||  || — || September 24, 2000 || Socorro || LINEAR || V || align=right | 1.0 km || 
|-id=296 bgcolor=#fefefe
| 205296 ||  || — || September 24, 2000 || Socorro || LINEAR || — || align=right | 1.7 km || 
|-id=297 bgcolor=#fefefe
| 205297 ||  || — || September 26, 2000 || Socorro || LINEAR || — || align=right | 1.2 km || 
|-id=298 bgcolor=#fefefe
| 205298 ||  || — || September 26, 2000 || Socorro || LINEAR || — || align=right | 1.3 km || 
|-id=299 bgcolor=#fefefe
| 205299 ||  || — || September 26, 2000 || Socorro || LINEAR || MAS || align=right | 1.0 km || 
|-id=300 bgcolor=#fefefe
| 205300 ||  || — || September 27, 2000 || Socorro || LINEAR || — || align=right | 1.3 km || 
|}

205301–205400 

|-bgcolor=#fefefe
| 205301 ||  || — || September 27, 2000 || Socorro || LINEAR || V || align=right | 1.1 km || 
|-id=302 bgcolor=#fefefe
| 205302 ||  || — || September 27, 2000 || Socorro || LINEAR || V || align=right | 1.1 km || 
|-id=303 bgcolor=#fefefe
| 205303 ||  || — || September 27, 2000 || Socorro || LINEAR || — || align=right | 1.5 km || 
|-id=304 bgcolor=#fefefe
| 205304 ||  || — || September 27, 2000 || Socorro || LINEAR || — || align=right | 1.9 km || 
|-id=305 bgcolor=#E9E9E9
| 205305 ||  || — || September 28, 2000 || Socorro || LINEAR || — || align=right | 1.9 km || 
|-id=306 bgcolor=#fefefe
| 205306 ||  || — || September 30, 2000 || Socorro || LINEAR || — || align=right | 1.3 km || 
|-id=307 bgcolor=#fefefe
| 205307 ||  || — || September 21, 2000 || Haleakala || NEAT || — || align=right | 1.6 km || 
|-id=308 bgcolor=#fefefe
| 205308 ||  || — || September 22, 2000 || Anderson Mesa || LONEOS || NYS || align=right | 2.0 km || 
|-id=309 bgcolor=#fefefe
| 205309 ||  || — || September 24, 2000 || Socorro || LINEAR || — || align=right | 1.1 km || 
|-id=310 bgcolor=#fefefe
| 205310 ||  || — || October 1, 2000 || Socorro || LINEAR || MAS || align=right | 1.1 km || 
|-id=311 bgcolor=#fefefe
| 205311 ||  || — || October 1, 2000 || Socorro || LINEAR || PHO || align=right | 4.5 km || 
|-id=312 bgcolor=#fefefe
| 205312 ||  || — || October 1, 2000 || Socorro || LINEAR || NYS || align=right data-sort-value="0.88" | 880 m || 
|-id=313 bgcolor=#fefefe
| 205313 ||  || — || October 1, 2000 || Socorro || LINEAR || — || align=right | 1.1 km || 
|-id=314 bgcolor=#fefefe
| 205314 ||  || — || October 1, 2000 || Socorro || LINEAR || NYS || align=right data-sort-value="0.86" | 860 m || 
|-id=315 bgcolor=#d6d6d6
| 205315 ||  || — || October 1, 2000 || Anderson Mesa || LONEOS || — || align=right | 6.2 km || 
|-id=316 bgcolor=#fefefe
| 205316 ||  || — || October 1, 2000 || Anderson Mesa || LONEOS || — || align=right | 1.4 km || 
|-id=317 bgcolor=#fefefe
| 205317 ||  || — || October 2, 2000 || Anderson Mesa || LONEOS || — || align=right | 1.2 km || 
|-id=318 bgcolor=#fefefe
| 205318 ||  || — || October 24, 2000 || Socorro || LINEAR || NYS || align=right | 1.3 km || 
|-id=319 bgcolor=#fefefe
| 205319 ||  || — || October 24, 2000 || Socorro || LINEAR || NYS || align=right data-sort-value="0.96" | 960 m || 
|-id=320 bgcolor=#fefefe
| 205320 ||  || — || October 24, 2000 || Socorro || LINEAR || — || align=right | 1.3 km || 
|-id=321 bgcolor=#fefefe
| 205321 ||  || — || October 25, 2000 || Socorro || LINEAR || MAS || align=right | 1.1 km || 
|-id=322 bgcolor=#fefefe
| 205322 ||  || — || October 25, 2000 || Socorro || LINEAR || PHO || align=right | 2.3 km || 
|-id=323 bgcolor=#fefefe
| 205323 ||  || — || October 24, 2000 || Socorro || LINEAR || NYS || align=right data-sort-value="0.95" | 950 m || 
|-id=324 bgcolor=#fefefe
| 205324 ||  || — || October 24, 2000 || Socorro || LINEAR || MAS || align=right | 1.2 km || 
|-id=325 bgcolor=#fefefe
| 205325 ||  || — || October 24, 2000 || Socorro || LINEAR || — || align=right | 1.6 km || 
|-id=326 bgcolor=#fefefe
| 205326 ||  || — || October 24, 2000 || Socorro || LINEAR || — || align=right | 3.8 km || 
|-id=327 bgcolor=#fefefe
| 205327 ||  || — || October 24, 2000 || Socorro || LINEAR || — || align=right | 1.4 km || 
|-id=328 bgcolor=#fefefe
| 205328 ||  || — || October 25, 2000 || Socorro || LINEAR || — || align=right | 1.3 km || 
|-id=329 bgcolor=#fefefe
| 205329 ||  || — || October 25, 2000 || Socorro || LINEAR || — || align=right | 1.4 km || 
|-id=330 bgcolor=#fefefe
| 205330 ||  || — || October 31, 2000 || Socorro || LINEAR || NYS || align=right data-sort-value="0.85" | 850 m || 
|-id=331 bgcolor=#fefefe
| 205331 ||  || — || October 24, 2000 || Socorro || LINEAR || — || align=right | 1.4 km || 
|-id=332 bgcolor=#fefefe
| 205332 ||  || — || October 25, 2000 || Socorro || LINEAR || — || align=right | 1.3 km || 
|-id=333 bgcolor=#fefefe
| 205333 ||  || — || October 25, 2000 || Socorro || LINEAR || — || align=right | 1.5 km || 
|-id=334 bgcolor=#fefefe
| 205334 ||  || — || October 25, 2000 || Socorro || LINEAR || — || align=right | 2.4 km || 
|-id=335 bgcolor=#fefefe
| 205335 ||  || — || October 25, 2000 || Socorro || LINEAR || FLO || align=right | 1.2 km || 
|-id=336 bgcolor=#fefefe
| 205336 ||  || — || October 25, 2000 || Socorro || LINEAR || V || align=right | 1.3 km || 
|-id=337 bgcolor=#fefefe
| 205337 ||  || — || November 1, 2000 || Socorro || LINEAR || — || align=right | 1.5 km || 
|-id=338 bgcolor=#fefefe
| 205338 ||  || — || November 1, 2000 || Socorro || LINEAR || — || align=right | 1.4 km || 
|-id=339 bgcolor=#fefefe
| 205339 ||  || — || November 3, 2000 || Socorro || LINEAR || — || align=right | 1.9 km || 
|-id=340 bgcolor=#fefefe
| 205340 ||  || — || November 3, 2000 || Socorro || LINEAR || KLI || align=right | 3.1 km || 
|-id=341 bgcolor=#fefefe
| 205341 ||  || — || November 3, 2000 || Socorro || LINEAR || — || align=right | 2.2 km || 
|-id=342 bgcolor=#fefefe
| 205342 ||  || — || November 19, 2000 || Socorro || LINEAR || — || align=right | 1.4 km || 
|-id=343 bgcolor=#fefefe
| 205343 ||  || — || November 20, 2000 || Socorro || LINEAR || V || align=right | 1.1 km || 
|-id=344 bgcolor=#fefefe
| 205344 ||  || — || November 21, 2000 || Socorro || LINEAR || MAS || align=right | 1.1 km || 
|-id=345 bgcolor=#fefefe
| 205345 ||  || — || November 21, 2000 || Socorro || LINEAR || NYS || align=right | 1.1 km || 
|-id=346 bgcolor=#fefefe
| 205346 ||  || — || November 20, 2000 || Socorro || LINEAR || — || align=right | 1.7 km || 
|-id=347 bgcolor=#fefefe
| 205347 ||  || — || November 20, 2000 || Socorro || LINEAR || — || align=right | 3.2 km || 
|-id=348 bgcolor=#fefefe
| 205348 ||  || — || November 27, 2000 || Kitt Peak || Spacewatch || MAS || align=right | 1.2 km || 
|-id=349 bgcolor=#fefefe
| 205349 ||  || — || November 20, 2000 || Socorro || LINEAR || — || align=right | 1.8 km || 
|-id=350 bgcolor=#fefefe
| 205350 ||  || — || November 20, 2000 || Socorro || LINEAR || NYS || align=right | 1.1 km || 
|-id=351 bgcolor=#fefefe
| 205351 ||  || — || November 27, 2000 || Socorro || LINEAR || V || align=right | 1.2 km || 
|-id=352 bgcolor=#fefefe
| 205352 ||  || — || November 29, 2000 || Socorro || LINEAR || H || align=right data-sort-value="0.97" | 970 m || 
|-id=353 bgcolor=#E9E9E9
| 205353 ||  || — || November 16, 2000 || Kitt Peak || Spacewatch || — || align=right | 2.2 km || 
|-id=354 bgcolor=#fefefe
| 205354 ||  || — || November 20, 2000 || Anderson Mesa || LONEOS || CHL || align=right | 2.9 km || 
|-id=355 bgcolor=#E9E9E9
| 205355 ||  || — || November 30, 2000 || Socorro || LINEAR || — || align=right | 2.1 km || 
|-id=356 bgcolor=#fefefe
| 205356 ||  || — || November 25, 2000 || Kitt Peak || Spacewatch || — || align=right | 1.3 km || 
|-id=357 bgcolor=#fefefe
| 205357 ||  || — || December 1, 2000 || Socorro || LINEAR || — || align=right | 4.9 km || 
|-id=358 bgcolor=#E9E9E9
| 205358 ||  || — || December 4, 2000 || Socorro || LINEAR || — || align=right | 2.0 km || 
|-id=359 bgcolor=#fefefe
| 205359 ||  || — || December 4, 2000 || Socorro || LINEAR || — || align=right | 1.2 km || 
|-id=360 bgcolor=#fefefe
| 205360 ||  || — || December 6, 2000 || Bisei SG Center || BATTeRS || — || align=right | 4.7 km || 
|-id=361 bgcolor=#E9E9E9
| 205361 ||  || — || December 5, 2000 || Socorro || LINEAR || — || align=right | 2.4 km || 
|-id=362 bgcolor=#E9E9E9
| 205362 ||  || — || December 15, 2000 || Uccle || T. Pauwels || — || align=right | 1.0 km || 
|-id=363 bgcolor=#fefefe
| 205363 ||  || — || December 21, 2000 || Socorro || LINEAR || H || align=right data-sort-value="0.83" | 830 m || 
|-id=364 bgcolor=#FA8072
| 205364 ||  || — || December 26, 2000 || Haleakala || NEAT || H || align=right | 1.1 km || 
|-id=365 bgcolor=#fefefe
| 205365 ||  || — || December 30, 2000 || Socorro || LINEAR || H || align=right data-sort-value="0.72" | 720 m || 
|-id=366 bgcolor=#E9E9E9
| 205366 ||  || — || December 30, 2000 || Socorro || LINEAR || — || align=right | 2.1 km || 
|-id=367 bgcolor=#E9E9E9
| 205367 ||  || — || December 30, 2000 || Socorro || LINEAR || — || align=right | 1.5 km || 
|-id=368 bgcolor=#fefefe
| 205368 ||  || — || December 30, 2000 || Socorro || LINEAR || — || align=right | 1.6 km || 
|-id=369 bgcolor=#fefefe
| 205369 ||  || — || December 30, 2000 || Socorro || LINEAR || H || align=right | 1.0 km || 
|-id=370 bgcolor=#fefefe
| 205370 ||  || — || December 29, 2000 || Anderson Mesa || LONEOS || — || align=right | 1.8 km || 
|-id=371 bgcolor=#fefefe
| 205371 || 2001 AX || — || January 1, 2001 || Kitt Peak || Spacewatch || NYS || align=right | 1.1 km || 
|-id=372 bgcolor=#fefefe
| 205372 ||  || — || January 2, 2001 || Socorro || LINEAR || MAS || align=right | 1.0 km || 
|-id=373 bgcolor=#fefefe
| 205373 ||  || — || January 3, 2001 || Socorro || LINEAR || — || align=right | 3.0 km || 
|-id=374 bgcolor=#fefefe
| 205374 ||  || — || January 5, 2001 || Socorro || LINEAR || H || align=right | 1.1 km || 
|-id=375 bgcolor=#fefefe
| 205375 ||  || — || January 4, 2001 || Socorro || LINEAR || H || align=right data-sort-value="0.68" | 680 m || 
|-id=376 bgcolor=#E9E9E9
| 205376 ||  || — || January 18, 2001 || Socorro || LINEAR || — || align=right | 2.7 km || 
|-id=377 bgcolor=#E9E9E9
| 205377 ||  || — || January 19, 2001 || Socorro || LINEAR || GER || align=right | 1.6 km || 
|-id=378 bgcolor=#FFC2E0
| 205378 ||  || — || January 18, 2001 || Haleakala || NEAT || AMO || align=right data-sort-value="0.63" | 630 m || 
|-id=379 bgcolor=#E9E9E9
| 205379 ||  || — || January 20, 2001 || Socorro || LINEAR || — || align=right | 1.4 km || 
|-id=380 bgcolor=#C2FFFF
| 205380 ||  || — || January 20, 2001 || Socorro || LINEAR || L4 || align=right | 14 km || 
|-id=381 bgcolor=#fefefe
| 205381 ||  || — || January 21, 2001 || Socorro || LINEAR || H || align=right data-sort-value="0.75" | 750 m || 
|-id=382 bgcolor=#E9E9E9
| 205382 ||  || — || January 19, 2001 || Socorro || LINEAR || — || align=right | 2.0 km || 
|-id=383 bgcolor=#fefefe
| 205383 ||  || — || January 21, 2001 || Socorro || LINEAR || H || align=right data-sort-value="0.94" | 940 m || 
|-id=384 bgcolor=#E9E9E9
| 205384 ||  || — || January 31, 2001 || Socorro || LINEAR || — || align=right | 2.3 km || 
|-id=385 bgcolor=#E9E9E9
| 205385 ||  || — || February 13, 2001 || Kitt Peak || Spacewatch || — || align=right | 1.5 km || 
|-id=386 bgcolor=#E9E9E9
| 205386 ||  || — || February 15, 2001 || Socorro || LINEAR || ADE || align=right | 3.9 km || 
|-id=387 bgcolor=#fefefe
| 205387 ||  || — || February 16, 2001 || Socorro || LINEAR || H || align=right data-sort-value="0.96" | 960 m || 
|-id=388 bgcolor=#FFC2E0
| 205388 ||  || — || February 17, 2001 || Socorro || LINEAR || AMO || align=right data-sort-value="0.27" | 270 m || 
|-id=389 bgcolor=#E9E9E9
| 205389 ||  || — || February 17, 2001 || Socorro || LINEAR || — || align=right | 1.5 km || 
|-id=390 bgcolor=#E9E9E9
| 205390 ||  || — || February 19, 2001 || Oizumi || T. Kobayashi || — || align=right | 3.1 km || 
|-id=391 bgcolor=#E9E9E9
| 205391 ||  || — || February 16, 2001 || Socorro || LINEAR || — || align=right | 1.5 km || 
|-id=392 bgcolor=#E9E9E9
| 205392 ||  || — || February 19, 2001 || Socorro || LINEAR || EUN || align=right | 1.8 km || 
|-id=393 bgcolor=#E9E9E9
| 205393 ||  || — || February 16, 2001 || Socorro || LINEAR || — || align=right | 1.8 km || 
|-id=394 bgcolor=#fefefe
| 205394 ||  || — || February 16, 2001 || Kitt Peak || Spacewatch || NYS || align=right data-sort-value="0.82" | 820 m || 
|-id=395 bgcolor=#E9E9E9
| 205395 ||  || — || February 22, 2001 || Kitt Peak || Spacewatch || — || align=right | 1.1 km || 
|-id=396 bgcolor=#fefefe
| 205396 ||  || — || February 19, 2001 || Anderson Mesa || LONEOS || H || align=right data-sort-value="0.84" | 840 m || 
|-id=397 bgcolor=#E9E9E9
| 205397 ||  || — || February 17, 2001 || Socorro || LINEAR || — || align=right | 1.4 km || 
|-id=398 bgcolor=#fefefe
| 205398 ||  || — || March 2, 2001 || Anderson Mesa || LONEOS || MAS || align=right data-sort-value="0.96" | 960 m || 
|-id=399 bgcolor=#E9E9E9
| 205399 ||  || — || March 2, 2001 || Anderson Mesa || LONEOS || — || align=right | 2.2 km || 
|-id=400 bgcolor=#E9E9E9
| 205400 ||  || — || March 2, 2001 || Anderson Mesa || LONEOS || — || align=right | 1.5 km || 
|}

205401–205500 

|-bgcolor=#E9E9E9
| 205401 ||  || — || March 2, 2001 || Haleakala || NEAT || — || align=right | 2.6 km || 
|-id=402 bgcolor=#fefefe
| 205402 ||  || — || March 3, 2001 || Socorro || LINEAR || H || align=right data-sort-value="0.82" | 820 m || 
|-id=403 bgcolor=#E9E9E9
| 205403 ||  || — || March 15, 2001 || Anderson Mesa || LONEOS || — || align=right | 3.6 km || 
|-id=404 bgcolor=#E9E9E9
| 205404 ||  || — || March 19, 2001 || Kitt Peak || Spacewatch || AGN || align=right | 1.6 km || 
|-id=405 bgcolor=#E9E9E9
| 205405 ||  || — || March 18, 2001 || Kitt Peak || Spacewatch || ADE || align=right | 2.3 km || 
|-id=406 bgcolor=#E9E9E9
| 205406 ||  || — || March 19, 2001 || Anderson Mesa || LONEOS || — || align=right | 1.4 km || 
|-id=407 bgcolor=#E9E9E9
| 205407 ||  || — || March 19, 2001 || Anderson Mesa || LONEOS || — || align=right | 2.3 km || 
|-id=408 bgcolor=#E9E9E9
| 205408 ||  || — || March 19, 2001 || Anderson Mesa || LONEOS || — || align=right | 4.1 km || 
|-id=409 bgcolor=#E9E9E9
| 205409 ||  || — || March 18, 2001 || Socorro || LINEAR || — || align=right | 1.6 km || 
|-id=410 bgcolor=#E9E9E9
| 205410 ||  || — || March 21, 2001 || Anderson Mesa || LONEOS || — || align=right | 1.8 km || 
|-id=411 bgcolor=#E9E9E9
| 205411 ||  || — || March 19, 2001 || Socorro || LINEAR || — || align=right | 1.5 km || 
|-id=412 bgcolor=#E9E9E9
| 205412 ||  || — || March 26, 2001 || Kitt Peak || Spacewatch || NEM || align=right | 2.8 km || 
|-id=413 bgcolor=#E9E9E9
| 205413 ||  || — || March 26, 2001 || Cerro Tololo || DLS || — || align=right | 2.7 km || 
|-id=414 bgcolor=#E9E9E9
| 205414 ||  || — || March 16, 2001 || Socorro || LINEAR || — || align=right | 1.9 km || 
|-id=415 bgcolor=#E9E9E9
| 205415 ||  || — || March 16, 2001 || Socorro || LINEAR || — || align=right | 3.0 km || 
|-id=416 bgcolor=#E9E9E9
| 205416 ||  || — || March 19, 2001 || Haleakala || NEAT || — || align=right | 1.7 km || 
|-id=417 bgcolor=#E9E9E9
| 205417 ||  || — || March 30, 2001 || Kitt Peak || Spacewatch || — || align=right | 1.3 km || 
|-id=418 bgcolor=#E9E9E9
| 205418 ||  || — || March 21, 2001 || Haleakala || NEAT || — || align=right | 2.3 km || 
|-id=419 bgcolor=#E9E9E9
| 205419 ||  || — || March 26, 2001 || Socorro || LINEAR || EUN || align=right | 1.6 km || 
|-id=420 bgcolor=#E9E9E9
| 205420 ||  || — || March 16, 2001 || Socorro || LINEAR || — || align=right | 1.6 km || 
|-id=421 bgcolor=#E9E9E9
| 205421 ||  || — || March 16, 2001 || Socorro || LINEAR || ADE || align=right | 2.5 km || 
|-id=422 bgcolor=#E9E9E9
| 205422 ||  || — || March 19, 2001 || Kitt Peak || Spacewatch || — || align=right data-sort-value="0.98" | 980 m || 
|-id=423 bgcolor=#E9E9E9
| 205423 ||  || — || March 25, 2001 || Anderson Mesa || LONEOS || — || align=right | 2.0 km || 
|-id=424 bgcolor=#E9E9E9
| 205424 Bibracte ||  ||  || April 13, 2001 || Le Creusot || J.-C. Merlin || — || align=right | 2.6 km || 
|-id=425 bgcolor=#E9E9E9
| 205425 ||  || — || April 15, 2001 || Socorro || LINEAR || — || align=right | 2.6 km || 
|-id=426 bgcolor=#E9E9E9
| 205426 ||  || — || April 25, 2001 || Desert Beaver || W. K. Y. Yeung || JUN || align=right | 1.9 km || 
|-id=427 bgcolor=#E9E9E9
| 205427 ||  || — || April 24, 2001 || Kitt Peak || Spacewatch || — || align=right | 1.2 km || 
|-id=428 bgcolor=#E9E9E9
| 205428 ||  || — || April 24, 2001 || Anderson Mesa || LONEOS || — || align=right | 2.2 km || 
|-id=429 bgcolor=#E9E9E9
| 205429 ||  || — || April 25, 2001 || Anderson Mesa || LONEOS || — || align=right | 2.9 km || 
|-id=430 bgcolor=#E9E9E9
| 205430 ||  || — || May 15, 2001 || Anderson Mesa || LONEOS || — || align=right | 2.5 km || 
|-id=431 bgcolor=#E9E9E9
| 205431 ||  || — || May 15, 2001 || Anderson Mesa || LONEOS || — || align=right | 3.5 km || 
|-id=432 bgcolor=#E9E9E9
| 205432 ||  || — || May 15, 2001 || Anderson Mesa || LONEOS || — || align=right | 2.7 km || 
|-id=433 bgcolor=#fefefe
| 205433 || 2001 KE || — || May 16, 2001 || Socorro || LINEAR || H || align=right | 1.4 km || 
|-id=434 bgcolor=#E9E9E9
| 205434 ||  || — || May 17, 2001 || Socorro || LINEAR || — || align=right | 2.6 km || 
|-id=435 bgcolor=#E9E9E9
| 205435 ||  || — || May 18, 2001 || Socorro || LINEAR || — || align=right | 1.5 km || 
|-id=436 bgcolor=#E9E9E9
| 205436 ||  || — || May 22, 2001 || Socorro || LINEAR || — || align=right | 4.3 km || 
|-id=437 bgcolor=#E9E9E9
| 205437 ||  || — || June 21, 2001 || Palomar || NEAT || — || align=right | 2.9 km || 
|-id=438 bgcolor=#E9E9E9
| 205438 ||  || — || June 21, 2001 || Palomar || NEAT || — || align=right | 3.6 km || 
|-id=439 bgcolor=#d6d6d6
| 205439 ||  || — || June 27, 2001 || Anderson Mesa || LONEOS || — || align=right | 5.8 km || 
|-id=440 bgcolor=#fefefe
| 205440 ||  || — || July 14, 2001 || Palomar || NEAT || — || align=right | 1.2 km || 
|-id=441 bgcolor=#d6d6d6
| 205441 ||  || — || July 14, 2001 || Palomar || NEAT || — || align=right | 6.0 km || 
|-id=442 bgcolor=#d6d6d6
| 205442 ||  || — || July 18, 2001 || Palomar || NEAT || 628 || align=right | 3.1 km || 
|-id=443 bgcolor=#d6d6d6
| 205443 ||  || — || July 17, 2001 || Anderson Mesa || LONEOS || — || align=right | 5.3 km || 
|-id=444 bgcolor=#E9E9E9
| 205444 ||  || — || July 18, 2001 || Palomar || NEAT || DOR || align=right | 4.5 km || 
|-id=445 bgcolor=#d6d6d6
| 205445 ||  || — || July 23, 2001 || Palomar || NEAT || — || align=right | 8.0 km || 
|-id=446 bgcolor=#fefefe
| 205446 ||  || — || July 18, 2001 || Palomar || NEAT || — || align=right | 1.1 km || 
|-id=447 bgcolor=#fefefe
| 205447 ||  || — || August 10, 2001 || Haleakala || NEAT || — || align=right | 1.2 km || 
|-id=448 bgcolor=#d6d6d6
| 205448 ||  || — || August 10, 2001 || Palomar || NEAT || — || align=right | 4.9 km || 
|-id=449 bgcolor=#d6d6d6
| 205449 ||  || — || August 10, 2001 || Palomar || NEAT || EOS || align=right | 2.7 km || 
|-id=450 bgcolor=#d6d6d6
| 205450 ||  || — || August 10, 2001 || Palomar || NEAT || — || align=right | 4.0 km || 
|-id=451 bgcolor=#d6d6d6
| 205451 ||  || — || August 11, 2001 || Palomar || NEAT || — || align=right | 5.1 km || 
|-id=452 bgcolor=#d6d6d6
| 205452 ||  || — || August 15, 2001 || Haleakala || NEAT || — || align=right | 6.8 km || 
|-id=453 bgcolor=#d6d6d6
| 205453 ||  || — || August 14, 2001 || Haleakala || NEAT || — || align=right | 4.3 km || 
|-id=454 bgcolor=#d6d6d6
| 205454 ||  || — || August 12, 2001 || Palomar || NEAT || EUP || align=right | 5.2 km || 
|-id=455 bgcolor=#d6d6d6
| 205455 ||  || — || August 16, 2001 || Socorro || LINEAR || HYG || align=right | 3.8 km || 
|-id=456 bgcolor=#d6d6d6
| 205456 ||  || — || August 16, 2001 || Socorro || LINEAR || THM || align=right | 3.8 km || 
|-id=457 bgcolor=#FA8072
| 205457 ||  || — || August 16, 2001 || Socorro || LINEAR || — || align=right | 1.3 km || 
|-id=458 bgcolor=#fefefe
| 205458 ||  || — || August 16, 2001 || Socorro || LINEAR || — || align=right data-sort-value="0.89" | 890 m || 
|-id=459 bgcolor=#E9E9E9
| 205459 ||  || — || August 16, 2001 || Socorro || LINEAR || PAE || align=right | 4.2 km || 
|-id=460 bgcolor=#d6d6d6
| 205460 ||  || — || August 16, 2001 || Socorro || LINEAR || — || align=right | 5.1 km || 
|-id=461 bgcolor=#d6d6d6
| 205461 ||  || — || August 16, 2001 || Socorro || LINEAR || — || align=right | 4.0 km || 
|-id=462 bgcolor=#fefefe
| 205462 ||  || — || August 16, 2001 || Socorro || LINEAR || — || align=right | 1.1 km || 
|-id=463 bgcolor=#d6d6d6
| 205463 ||  || — || August 17, 2001 || Socorro || LINEAR || — || align=right | 5.3 km || 
|-id=464 bgcolor=#d6d6d6
| 205464 ||  || — || August 19, 2001 || Socorro || LINEAR || Tj (2.98) || align=right | 5.2 km || 
|-id=465 bgcolor=#d6d6d6
| 205465 ||  || — || August 16, 2001 || Palomar || NEAT || — || align=right | 6.7 km || 
|-id=466 bgcolor=#d6d6d6
| 205466 ||  || — || August 18, 2001 || Palomar || NEAT || — || align=right | 4.7 km || 
|-id=467 bgcolor=#d6d6d6
| 205467 ||  || — || August 25, 2001 || Socorro || LINEAR || — || align=right | 4.4 km || 
|-id=468 bgcolor=#d6d6d6
| 205468 ||  || — || August 25, 2001 || Socorro || LINEAR || EOS || align=right | 3.9 km || 
|-id=469 bgcolor=#d6d6d6
| 205469 ||  || — || August 26, 2001 || Ondřejov || P. Pravec, P. Kušnirák || EOS || align=right | 2.7 km || 
|-id=470 bgcolor=#fefefe
| 205470 ||  || — || August 17, 2001 || Socorro || LINEAR || — || align=right | 1.3 km || 
|-id=471 bgcolor=#d6d6d6
| 205471 ||  || — || August 19, 2001 || Socorro || LINEAR || CHA || align=right | 3.5 km || 
|-id=472 bgcolor=#d6d6d6
| 205472 ||  || — || August 26, 2001 || Desert Eagle || W. K. Y. Yeung || URS || align=right | 5.0 km || 
|-id=473 bgcolor=#d6d6d6
| 205473 ||  || — || August 23, 2001 || Anderson Mesa || LONEOS || EUP || align=right | 7.0 km || 
|-id=474 bgcolor=#d6d6d6
| 205474 ||  || — || August 23, 2001 || Anderson Mesa || LONEOS || — || align=right | 3.9 km || 
|-id=475 bgcolor=#d6d6d6
| 205475 ||  || — || August 23, 2001 || Anderson Mesa || LONEOS || — || align=right | 5.2 km || 
|-id=476 bgcolor=#fefefe
| 205476 ||  || — || August 21, 2001 || Kitt Peak || Spacewatch || — || align=right data-sort-value="0.87" | 870 m || 
|-id=477 bgcolor=#fefefe
| 205477 ||  || — || August 21, 2001 || Haleakala || NEAT || — || align=right data-sort-value="0.79" | 790 m || 
|-id=478 bgcolor=#d6d6d6
| 205478 ||  || — || August 22, 2001 || Socorro || LINEAR || EUP || align=right | 8.6 km || 
|-id=479 bgcolor=#d6d6d6
| 205479 ||  || — || August 23, 2001 || Anderson Mesa || LONEOS || TEL || align=right | 2.3 km || 
|-id=480 bgcolor=#d6d6d6
| 205480 ||  || — || August 23, 2001 || Anderson Mesa || LONEOS || — || align=right | 4.5 km || 
|-id=481 bgcolor=#d6d6d6
| 205481 ||  || — || August 23, 2001 || Anderson Mesa || LONEOS || — || align=right | 3.9 km || 
|-id=482 bgcolor=#fefefe
| 205482 ||  || — || August 23, 2001 || Anderson Mesa || LONEOS || — || align=right | 1.0 km || 
|-id=483 bgcolor=#d6d6d6
| 205483 ||  || — || August 24, 2001 || Anderson Mesa || LONEOS || — || align=right | 3.4 km || 
|-id=484 bgcolor=#d6d6d6
| 205484 ||  || — || August 24, 2001 || Socorro || LINEAR || — || align=right | 4.7 km || 
|-id=485 bgcolor=#d6d6d6
| 205485 ||  || — || August 24, 2001 || Socorro || LINEAR || — || align=right | 5.1 km || 
|-id=486 bgcolor=#d6d6d6
| 205486 ||  || — || August 24, 2001 || Socorro || LINEAR || — || align=right | 4.8 km || 
|-id=487 bgcolor=#d6d6d6
| 205487 ||  || — || August 24, 2001 || Socorro || LINEAR || 7:4 || align=right | 5.8 km || 
|-id=488 bgcolor=#fefefe
| 205488 ||  || — || August 24, 2001 || Socorro || LINEAR || FLO || align=right data-sort-value="0.86" | 860 m || 
|-id=489 bgcolor=#fefefe
| 205489 ||  || — || August 24, 2001 || Socorro || LINEAR || — || align=right | 1.3 km || 
|-id=490 bgcolor=#d6d6d6
| 205490 ||  || — || August 25, 2001 || Socorro || LINEAR || — || align=right | 5.9 km || 
|-id=491 bgcolor=#fefefe
| 205491 ||  || — || August 20, 2001 || Socorro || LINEAR || — || align=right | 1.3 km || 
|-id=492 bgcolor=#d6d6d6
| 205492 ||  || — || August 20, 2001 || Palomar || NEAT || EUP || align=right | 6.1 km || 
|-id=493 bgcolor=#d6d6d6
| 205493 ||  || — || August 20, 2001 || Palomar || NEAT || ALA || align=right | 8.3 km || 
|-id=494 bgcolor=#d6d6d6
| 205494 ||  || — || August 24, 2001 || Anderson Mesa || LONEOS || — || align=right | 3.0 km || 
|-id=495 bgcolor=#fefefe
| 205495 ||  || — || August 24, 2001 || Socorro || LINEAR || — || align=right | 1.7 km || 
|-id=496 bgcolor=#d6d6d6
| 205496 ||  || — || August 16, 2001 || Palomar || NEAT || EUP || align=right | 4.9 km || 
|-id=497 bgcolor=#d6d6d6
| 205497 ||  || — || August 16, 2001 || Palomar || NEAT || — || align=right | 5.4 km || 
|-id=498 bgcolor=#FA8072
| 205498 ||  || — || September 10, 2001 || Haleakala || NEAT || — || align=right data-sort-value="0.95" | 950 m || 
|-id=499 bgcolor=#d6d6d6
| 205499 ||  || — || September 11, 2001 || Desert Eagle || W. K. Y. Yeung || EUP || align=right | 7.0 km || 
|-id=500 bgcolor=#d6d6d6
| 205500 ||  || — || September 7, 2001 || Socorro || LINEAR || EOS || align=right | 2.7 km || 
|}

205501–205600 

|-bgcolor=#d6d6d6
| 205501 ||  || — || September 7, 2001 || Socorro || LINEAR || — || align=right | 4.8 km || 
|-id=502 bgcolor=#fefefe
| 205502 ||  || — || September 7, 2001 || Socorro || LINEAR || — || align=right data-sort-value="0.91" | 910 m || 
|-id=503 bgcolor=#d6d6d6
| 205503 ||  || — || September 8, 2001 || Socorro || LINEAR || — || align=right | 3.6 km || 
|-id=504 bgcolor=#d6d6d6
| 205504 ||  || — || September 11, 2001 || Socorro || LINEAR || KOR || align=right | 2.1 km || 
|-id=505 bgcolor=#d6d6d6
| 205505 ||  || — || September 12, 2001 || Socorro || LINEAR || — || align=right | 3.5 km || 
|-id=506 bgcolor=#d6d6d6
| 205506 ||  || — || September 12, 2001 || Socorro || LINEAR || — || align=right | 4.7 km || 
|-id=507 bgcolor=#d6d6d6
| 205507 ||  || — || September 11, 2001 || Anderson Mesa || LONEOS || — || align=right | 3.9 km || 
|-id=508 bgcolor=#d6d6d6
| 205508 ||  || — || September 12, 2001 || Socorro || LINEAR || — || align=right | 3.2 km || 
|-id=509 bgcolor=#d6d6d6
| 205509 ||  || — || September 12, 2001 || Socorro || LINEAR || HYG || align=right | 4.9 km || 
|-id=510 bgcolor=#d6d6d6
| 205510 ||  || — || September 12, 2001 || Socorro || LINEAR || THM || align=right | 4.7 km || 
|-id=511 bgcolor=#d6d6d6
| 205511 ||  || — || September 12, 2001 || Socorro || LINEAR || — || align=right | 3.1 km || 
|-id=512 bgcolor=#d6d6d6
| 205512 ||  || — || September 11, 2001 || Anderson Mesa || LONEOS || KOR || align=right | 2.1 km || 
|-id=513 bgcolor=#fefefe
| 205513 ||  || — || September 17, 2001 || Desert Eagle || W. K. Y. Yeung || — || align=right | 1.3 km || 
|-id=514 bgcolor=#d6d6d6
| 205514 ||  || — || September 18, 2001 || Desert Eagle || W. K. Y. Yeung || EUP || align=right | 7.5 km || 
|-id=515 bgcolor=#d6d6d6
| 205515 ||  || — || September 16, 2001 || Socorro || LINEAR || — || align=right | 3.7 km || 
|-id=516 bgcolor=#d6d6d6
| 205516 ||  || — || September 16, 2001 || Socorro || LINEAR || THM || align=right | 3.3 km || 
|-id=517 bgcolor=#d6d6d6
| 205517 ||  || — || September 16, 2001 || Socorro || LINEAR || HYG || align=right | 6.1 km || 
|-id=518 bgcolor=#fefefe
| 205518 ||  || — || September 16, 2001 || Socorro || LINEAR || — || align=right | 1.4 km || 
|-id=519 bgcolor=#d6d6d6
| 205519 ||  || — || September 17, 2001 || Socorro || LINEAR || EOS || align=right | 7.8 km || 
|-id=520 bgcolor=#fefefe
| 205520 ||  || — || September 17, 2001 || Socorro || LINEAR || FLO || align=right | 1.3 km || 
|-id=521 bgcolor=#d6d6d6
| 205521 ||  || — || September 20, 2001 || Socorro || LINEAR || KOR || align=right | 1.7 km || 
|-id=522 bgcolor=#d6d6d6
| 205522 ||  || — || September 20, 2001 || Socorro || LINEAR || — || align=right | 3.0 km || 
|-id=523 bgcolor=#d6d6d6
| 205523 ||  || — || September 20, 2001 || Socorro || LINEAR || HYG || align=right | 3.8 km || 
|-id=524 bgcolor=#d6d6d6
| 205524 ||  || — || September 20, 2001 || Socorro || LINEAR || THM || align=right | 2.9 km || 
|-id=525 bgcolor=#fefefe
| 205525 ||  || — || September 20, 2001 || Desert Eagle || W. K. Y. Yeung || — || align=right data-sort-value="0.86" | 860 m || 
|-id=526 bgcolor=#d6d6d6
| 205526 ||  || — || September 20, 2001 || Desert Eagle || W. K. Y. Yeung || — || align=right | 5.5 km || 
|-id=527 bgcolor=#d6d6d6
| 205527 ||  || — || September 16, 2001 || Socorro || LINEAR || — || align=right | 4.4 km || 
|-id=528 bgcolor=#fefefe
| 205528 ||  || — || September 16, 2001 || Socorro || LINEAR || — || align=right data-sort-value="0.92" | 920 m || 
|-id=529 bgcolor=#d6d6d6
| 205529 ||  || — || September 16, 2001 || Socorro || LINEAR || EOS || align=right | 3.0 km || 
|-id=530 bgcolor=#d6d6d6
| 205530 ||  || — || September 16, 2001 || Socorro || LINEAR || EOS || align=right | 3.0 km || 
|-id=531 bgcolor=#d6d6d6
| 205531 ||  || — || September 16, 2001 || Socorro || LINEAR || HYG || align=right | 4.7 km || 
|-id=532 bgcolor=#d6d6d6
| 205532 ||  || — || September 16, 2001 || Socorro || LINEAR || — || align=right | 3.4 km || 
|-id=533 bgcolor=#d6d6d6
| 205533 ||  || — || September 16, 2001 || Socorro || LINEAR || — || align=right | 4.1 km || 
|-id=534 bgcolor=#fefefe
| 205534 ||  || — || September 17, 2001 || Socorro || LINEAR || — || align=right data-sort-value="0.90" | 900 m || 
|-id=535 bgcolor=#d6d6d6
| 205535 ||  || — || September 19, 2001 || Socorro || LINEAR || EOS || align=right | 3.0 km || 
|-id=536 bgcolor=#d6d6d6
| 205536 ||  || — || September 19, 2001 || Socorro || LINEAR || — || align=right | 4.3 km || 
|-id=537 bgcolor=#fefefe
| 205537 ||  || — || September 19, 2001 || Socorro || LINEAR || V || align=right | 1.0 km || 
|-id=538 bgcolor=#d6d6d6
| 205538 ||  || — || September 22, 2001 || Eskridge || G. Hug || — || align=right | 4.0 km || 
|-id=539 bgcolor=#d6d6d6
| 205539 ||  || — || September 16, 2001 || Socorro || LINEAR || NAE || align=right | 4.0 km || 
|-id=540 bgcolor=#d6d6d6
| 205540 ||  || — || September 16, 2001 || Socorro || LINEAR || THM || align=right | 3.6 km || 
|-id=541 bgcolor=#fefefe
| 205541 ||  || — || September 16, 2001 || Socorro || LINEAR || — || align=right data-sort-value="0.87" | 870 m || 
|-id=542 bgcolor=#d6d6d6
| 205542 ||  || — || September 16, 2001 || Socorro || LINEAR || — || align=right | 3.8 km || 
|-id=543 bgcolor=#d6d6d6
| 205543 ||  || — || September 16, 2001 || Socorro || LINEAR || — || align=right | 3.5 km || 
|-id=544 bgcolor=#d6d6d6
| 205544 ||  || — || September 19, 2001 || Socorro || LINEAR || THM || align=right | 3.2 km || 
|-id=545 bgcolor=#d6d6d6
| 205545 ||  || — || September 19, 2001 || Socorro || LINEAR || 615 || align=right | 2.1 km || 
|-id=546 bgcolor=#d6d6d6
| 205546 ||  || — || September 19, 2001 || Socorro || LINEAR || — || align=right | 2.8 km || 
|-id=547 bgcolor=#d6d6d6
| 205547 ||  || — || September 19, 2001 || Socorro || LINEAR || — || align=right | 3.7 km || 
|-id=548 bgcolor=#d6d6d6
| 205548 ||  || — || September 19, 2001 || Socorro || LINEAR || KOR || align=right | 2.6 km || 
|-id=549 bgcolor=#d6d6d6
| 205549 ||  || — || September 19, 2001 || Socorro || LINEAR || — || align=right | 4.2 km || 
|-id=550 bgcolor=#fefefe
| 205550 ||  || — || September 19, 2001 || Socorro || LINEAR || — || align=right | 1.0 km || 
|-id=551 bgcolor=#d6d6d6
| 205551 ||  || — || September 19, 2001 || Socorro || LINEAR || — || align=right | 3.2 km || 
|-id=552 bgcolor=#d6d6d6
| 205552 ||  || — || September 19, 2001 || Socorro || LINEAR || THM || align=right | 3.3 km || 
|-id=553 bgcolor=#d6d6d6
| 205553 ||  || — || September 19, 2001 || Socorro || LINEAR || — || align=right | 5.1 km || 
|-id=554 bgcolor=#d6d6d6
| 205554 ||  || — || September 19, 2001 || Socorro || LINEAR || — || align=right | 4.5 km || 
|-id=555 bgcolor=#fefefe
| 205555 ||  || — || September 19, 2001 || Socorro || LINEAR || — || align=right | 1.3 km || 
|-id=556 bgcolor=#fefefe
| 205556 ||  || — || September 19, 2001 || Socorro || LINEAR || — || align=right data-sort-value="0.99" | 990 m || 
|-id=557 bgcolor=#d6d6d6
| 205557 ||  || — || September 25, 2001 || Bohyunsan || Y.-B. Jeon, B.-C. Lee || HYG || align=right | 4.3 km || 
|-id=558 bgcolor=#d6d6d6
| 205558 ||  || — || September 27, 2001 || Emerald Lane || L. Ball || — || align=right | 3.4 km || 
|-id=559 bgcolor=#d6d6d6
| 205559 ||  || — || September 20, 2001 || Kitt Peak || Spacewatch || — || align=right | 3.8 km || 
|-id=560 bgcolor=#FA8072
| 205560 ||  || — || September 22, 2001 || Anderson Mesa || LONEOS || — || align=right | 1.8 km || 
|-id=561 bgcolor=#d6d6d6
| 205561 ||  || — || September 28, 2001 || Palomar || NEAT || EOS || align=right | 4.8 km || 
|-id=562 bgcolor=#d6d6d6
| 205562 ||  || — || September 21, 2001 || Anderson Mesa || LONEOS || — || align=right | 5.0 km || 
|-id=563 bgcolor=#d6d6d6
| 205563 ||  || — || September 20, 2001 || Socorro || LINEAR || KOR || align=right | 2.3 km || 
|-id=564 bgcolor=#d6d6d6
| 205564 ||  || — || September 20, 2001 || Socorro || LINEAR || — || align=right | 3.8 km || 
|-id=565 bgcolor=#d6d6d6
| 205565 ||  || — || September 20, 2001 || Socorro || LINEAR || — || align=right | 4.6 km || 
|-id=566 bgcolor=#fefefe
| 205566 ||  || — || September 21, 2001 || Socorro || LINEAR || — || align=right data-sort-value="0.59" | 590 m || 
|-id=567 bgcolor=#fefefe
| 205567 ||  || — || September 23, 2001 || Socorro || LINEAR || — || align=right | 2.2 km || 
|-id=568 bgcolor=#d6d6d6
| 205568 ||  || — || September 25, 2001 || Socorro || LINEAR || — || align=right | 5.4 km || 
|-id=569 bgcolor=#fefefe
| 205569 ||  || — || September 25, 2001 || Socorro || LINEAR || — || align=right data-sort-value="0.99" | 990 m || 
|-id=570 bgcolor=#fefefe
| 205570 ||  || — || September 16, 2001 || Socorro || LINEAR || FLO || align=right data-sort-value="0.63" | 630 m || 
|-id=571 bgcolor=#d6d6d6
| 205571 ||  || — || September 20, 2001 || Socorro || LINEAR || — || align=right | 3.1 km || 
|-id=572 bgcolor=#fefefe
| 205572 ||  || — || September 20, 2001 || Socorro || LINEAR || — || align=right data-sort-value="0.69" | 690 m || 
|-id=573 bgcolor=#d6d6d6
| 205573 ||  || — || October 10, 2001 || Palomar || NEAT || — || align=right | 3.9 km || 
|-id=574 bgcolor=#d6d6d6
| 205574 ||  || — || October 13, 2001 || Socorro || LINEAR || — || align=right | 4.5 km || 
|-id=575 bgcolor=#fefefe
| 205575 ||  || — || October 14, 2001 || Socorro || LINEAR || — || align=right data-sort-value="0.91" | 910 m || 
|-id=576 bgcolor=#d6d6d6
| 205576 ||  || — || October 15, 2001 || Socorro || LINEAR || EUP || align=right | 7.7 km || 
|-id=577 bgcolor=#d6d6d6
| 205577 ||  || — || October 14, 2001 || Cima Ekar || ADAS || — || align=right | 5.6 km || 
|-id=578 bgcolor=#d6d6d6
| 205578 ||  || — || October 14, 2001 || Socorro || LINEAR || HYG || align=right | 3.8 km || 
|-id=579 bgcolor=#d6d6d6
| 205579 ||  || — || October 15, 2001 || Socorro || LINEAR || HYG || align=right | 3.8 km || 
|-id=580 bgcolor=#d6d6d6
| 205580 ||  || — || October 13, 2001 || Socorro || LINEAR || HYG || align=right | 5.8 km || 
|-id=581 bgcolor=#d6d6d6
| 205581 ||  || — || October 14, 2001 || Socorro || LINEAR || — || align=right | 3.8 km || 
|-id=582 bgcolor=#fefefe
| 205582 ||  || — || October 14, 2001 || Socorro || LINEAR || FLO || align=right data-sort-value="0.69" | 690 m || 
|-id=583 bgcolor=#fefefe
| 205583 ||  || — || October 13, 2001 || Palomar || NEAT || — || align=right data-sort-value="0.97" | 970 m || 
|-id=584 bgcolor=#d6d6d6
| 205584 ||  || — || October 10, 2001 || Palomar || NEAT || — || align=right | 3.7 km || 
|-id=585 bgcolor=#fefefe
| 205585 ||  || — || October 10, 2001 || Palomar || NEAT || — || align=right data-sort-value="0.87" | 870 m || 
|-id=586 bgcolor=#d6d6d6
| 205586 ||  || — || October 10, 2001 || Palomar || NEAT || — || align=right | 3.1 km || 
|-id=587 bgcolor=#fefefe
| 205587 ||  || — || October 10, 2001 || Palomar || NEAT || FLO || align=right data-sort-value="0.92" | 920 m || 
|-id=588 bgcolor=#fefefe
| 205588 ||  || — || October 10, 2001 || Palomar || NEAT || FLO || align=right data-sort-value="0.75" | 750 m || 
|-id=589 bgcolor=#d6d6d6
| 205589 ||  || — || October 14, 2001 || Socorro || LINEAR || — || align=right | 4.6 km || 
|-id=590 bgcolor=#d6d6d6
| 205590 ||  || — || October 14, 2001 || Socorro || LINEAR || — || align=right | 5.0 km || 
|-id=591 bgcolor=#fefefe
| 205591 ||  || — || October 14, 2001 || Socorro || LINEAR || — || align=right data-sort-value="0.87" | 870 m || 
|-id=592 bgcolor=#fefefe
| 205592 ||  || — || October 14, 2001 || Socorro || LINEAR || — || align=right | 1.2 km || 
|-id=593 bgcolor=#fefefe
| 205593 ||  || — || October 11, 2001 || Socorro || LINEAR || — || align=right data-sort-value="0.86" | 860 m || 
|-id=594 bgcolor=#d6d6d6
| 205594 ||  || — || October 11, 2001 || Socorro || LINEAR || — || align=right | 4.8 km || 
|-id=595 bgcolor=#d6d6d6
| 205595 ||  || — || October 11, 2001 || Socorro || LINEAR || EOS || align=right | 3.2 km || 
|-id=596 bgcolor=#d6d6d6
| 205596 ||  || — || October 15, 2001 || Socorro || LINEAR || TIR || align=right | 4.2 km || 
|-id=597 bgcolor=#d6d6d6
| 205597 ||  || — || October 15, 2001 || Palomar || NEAT || LIX || align=right | 6.3 km || 
|-id=598 bgcolor=#d6d6d6
| 205598 ||  || — || October 15, 2001 || Kitt Peak || Spacewatch || — || align=right | 4.8 km || 
|-id=599 bgcolor=#fefefe
| 205599 Walkowicz ||  ||  || October 14, 2001 || Apache Point || SDSS || — || align=right data-sort-value="0.65" | 650 m || 
|-id=600 bgcolor=#fefefe
| 205600 ||  || — || October 14, 2001 || Apache Point || SDSS || — || align=right data-sort-value="0.75" | 750 m || 
|}

205601–205700 

|-bgcolor=#d6d6d6
| 205601 ||  || — || October 14, 2001 || Cima Ekar || ADAS || — || align=right | 5.2 km || 
|-id=602 bgcolor=#fefefe
| 205602 ||  || — || October 18, 2001 || Socorro || LINEAR || — || align=right | 1.3 km || 
|-id=603 bgcolor=#fefefe
| 205603 ||  || — || October 16, 2001 || Socorro || LINEAR || FLO || align=right | 1.0 km || 
|-id=604 bgcolor=#d6d6d6
| 205604 ||  || — || October 17, 2001 || Socorro || LINEAR || — || align=right | 5.2 km || 
|-id=605 bgcolor=#d6d6d6
| 205605 ||  || — || October 21, 2001 || Kitt Peak || Spacewatch || THM || align=right | 3.2 km || 
|-id=606 bgcolor=#fefefe
| 205606 ||  || — || October 20, 2001 || Socorro || LINEAR || FLO || align=right data-sort-value="0.64" | 640 m || 
|-id=607 bgcolor=#d6d6d6
| 205607 ||  || — || October 20, 2001 || Socorro || LINEAR || VER || align=right | 5.2 km || 
|-id=608 bgcolor=#d6d6d6
| 205608 ||  || — || October 18, 2001 || Socorro || LINEAR || VER || align=right | 5.7 km || 
|-id=609 bgcolor=#fefefe
| 205609 ||  || — || October 23, 2001 || Socorro || LINEAR || — || align=right | 1.0 km || 
|-id=610 bgcolor=#fefefe
| 205610 ||  || — || October 23, 2001 || Socorro || LINEAR || FLO || align=right data-sort-value="0.88" | 880 m || 
|-id=611 bgcolor=#fefefe
| 205611 ||  || — || October 23, 2001 || Socorro || LINEAR || — || align=right data-sort-value="0.83" | 830 m || 
|-id=612 bgcolor=#fefefe
| 205612 ||  || — || October 23, 2001 || Kitt Peak || Spacewatch || — || align=right data-sort-value="0.84" | 840 m || 
|-id=613 bgcolor=#fefefe
| 205613 ||  || — || October 19, 2001 || Socorro || LINEAR || — || align=right | 1.8 km || 
|-id=614 bgcolor=#d6d6d6
| 205614 ||  || — || October 18, 2001 || Palomar || NEAT || — || align=right | 3.9 km || 
|-id=615 bgcolor=#d6d6d6
| 205615 ||  || — || October 26, 2001 || Palomar || NEAT || — || align=right | 4.8 km || 
|-id=616 bgcolor=#fefefe
| 205616 ||  || — || October 18, 2001 || Palomar || NEAT || — || align=right data-sort-value="0.93" | 930 m || 
|-id=617 bgcolor=#d6d6d6
| 205617 ||  || — || October 19, 2001 || Palomar || NEAT || HYG || align=right | 3.8 km || 
|-id=618 bgcolor=#fefefe
| 205618 ||  || — || October 19, 2001 || Palomar || NEAT || — || align=right data-sort-value="0.77" | 770 m || 
|-id=619 bgcolor=#d6d6d6
| 205619 ||  || — || October 19, 2001 || Palomar || NEAT || HYG || align=right | 3.9 km || 
|-id=620 bgcolor=#d6d6d6
| 205620 ||  || — || October 24, 2001 || Palomar || NEAT || EOS || align=right | 3.1 km || 
|-id=621 bgcolor=#fefefe
| 205621 ||  || — || October 21, 2001 || Socorro || LINEAR || — || align=right | 1.0 km || 
|-id=622 bgcolor=#fefefe
| 205622 ||  || — || November 6, 2001 || Socorro || LINEAR || PHO || align=right | 1.6 km || 
|-id=623 bgcolor=#fefefe
| 205623 ||  || — || November 8, 2001 || Palomar || NEAT || FLO || align=right data-sort-value="0.99" | 990 m || 
|-id=624 bgcolor=#fefefe
| 205624 ||  || — || November 9, 2001 || Bergisch Gladbach || W. Bickel || FLO || align=right | 1.2 km || 
|-id=625 bgcolor=#d6d6d6
| 205625 ||  || — || November 9, 2001 || Socorro || LINEAR || — || align=right | 4.9 km || 
|-id=626 bgcolor=#fefefe
| 205626 ||  || — || November 9, 2001 || Socorro || LINEAR || — || align=right | 1.2 km || 
|-id=627 bgcolor=#fefefe
| 205627 ||  || — || November 10, 2001 || Socorro || LINEAR || — || align=right | 1.3 km || 
|-id=628 bgcolor=#fefefe
| 205628 ||  || — || November 10, 2001 || Socorro || LINEAR || — || align=right | 1.1 km || 
|-id=629 bgcolor=#fefefe
| 205629 ||  || — || November 11, 2001 || Socorro || LINEAR || — || align=right | 1.2 km || 
|-id=630 bgcolor=#fefefe
| 205630 ||  || — || November 10, 2001 || Palomar || NEAT || FLO || align=right data-sort-value="0.79" | 790 m || 
|-id=631 bgcolor=#d6d6d6
| 205631 ||  || — || November 12, 2001 || Socorro || LINEAR || — || align=right | 4.6 km || 
|-id=632 bgcolor=#fefefe
| 205632 ||  || — || November 17, 2001 || Socorro || LINEAR || FLO || align=right data-sort-value="0.79" | 790 m || 
|-id=633 bgcolor=#d6d6d6
| 205633 ||  || — || November 17, 2001 || Kitt Peak || Spacewatch || THM || align=right | 2.8 km || 
|-id=634 bgcolor=#fefefe
| 205634 ||  || — || November 17, 2001 || Socorro || LINEAR || FLO || align=right data-sort-value="0.99" | 990 m || 
|-id=635 bgcolor=#fefefe
| 205635 ||  || — || November 19, 2001 || Socorro || LINEAR || — || align=right data-sort-value="0.67" | 670 m || 
|-id=636 bgcolor=#d6d6d6
| 205636 ||  || — || November 20, 2001 || Socorro || LINEAR || — || align=right | 3.6 km || 
|-id=637 bgcolor=#d6d6d6
| 205637 ||  || — || November 20, 2001 || Socorro || LINEAR || — || align=right | 4.0 km || 
|-id=638 bgcolor=#fefefe
| 205638 ||  || — || November 19, 2001 || Socorro || LINEAR || FLO || align=right data-sort-value="0.99" | 990 m || 
|-id=639 bgcolor=#d6d6d6
| 205639 ||  || — || November 20, 2001 || Socorro || LINEAR || — || align=right | 4.8 km || 
|-id=640 bgcolor=#FA8072
| 205640 ||  || — || December 9, 2001 || Socorro || LINEAR || — || align=right | 1.7 km || 
|-id=641 bgcolor=#fefefe
| 205641 ||  || — || December 9, 2001 || Socorro || LINEAR || FLO || align=right | 1.1 km || 
|-id=642 bgcolor=#fefefe
| 205642 ||  || — || December 9, 2001 || Socorro || LINEAR || — || align=right | 1.5 km || 
|-id=643 bgcolor=#fefefe
| 205643 ||  || — || December 9, 2001 || Socorro || LINEAR || — || align=right data-sort-value="0.87" | 870 m || 
|-id=644 bgcolor=#fefefe
| 205644 ||  || — || December 10, 2001 || Socorro || LINEAR || FLO || align=right data-sort-value="0.98" | 980 m || 
|-id=645 bgcolor=#fefefe
| 205645 ||  || — || December 10, 2001 || Socorro || LINEAR || — || align=right | 1.4 km || 
|-id=646 bgcolor=#fefefe
| 205646 ||  || — || December 10, 2001 || Socorro || LINEAR || — || align=right | 1.2 km || 
|-id=647 bgcolor=#fefefe
| 205647 ||  || — || December 10, 2001 || Socorro || LINEAR || — || align=right data-sort-value="0.86" | 860 m || 
|-id=648 bgcolor=#fefefe
| 205648 ||  || — || December 10, 2001 || Socorro || LINEAR || — || align=right | 1.6 km || 
|-id=649 bgcolor=#fefefe
| 205649 ||  || — || December 10, 2001 || Socorro || LINEAR || — || align=right | 1.2 km || 
|-id=650 bgcolor=#fefefe
| 205650 ||  || — || December 10, 2001 || Socorro || LINEAR || FLO || align=right | 1.0 km || 
|-id=651 bgcolor=#fefefe
| 205651 ||  || — || December 14, 2001 || Socorro || LINEAR || — || align=right | 1.3 km || 
|-id=652 bgcolor=#fefefe
| 205652 ||  || — || December 10, 2001 || Socorro || LINEAR || — || align=right | 1.2 km || 
|-id=653 bgcolor=#fefefe
| 205653 ||  || — || December 10, 2001 || Socorro || LINEAR || — || align=right | 1.7 km || 
|-id=654 bgcolor=#fefefe
| 205654 ||  || — || December 14, 2001 || Socorro || LINEAR || — || align=right data-sort-value="0.98" | 980 m || 
|-id=655 bgcolor=#fefefe
| 205655 ||  || — || December 14, 2001 || Socorro || LINEAR || FLO || align=right data-sort-value="0.96" | 960 m || 
|-id=656 bgcolor=#d6d6d6
| 205656 ||  || — || December 14, 2001 || Socorro || LINEAR || — || align=right | 5.5 km || 
|-id=657 bgcolor=#fefefe
| 205657 ||  || — || December 14, 2001 || Socorro || LINEAR || FLO || align=right data-sort-value="0.85" | 850 m || 
|-id=658 bgcolor=#fefefe
| 205658 ||  || — || December 14, 2001 || Socorro || LINEAR || — || align=right | 1.1 km || 
|-id=659 bgcolor=#fefefe
| 205659 ||  || — || December 14, 2001 || Socorro || LINEAR || — || align=right data-sort-value="0.94" | 940 m || 
|-id=660 bgcolor=#fefefe
| 205660 ||  || — || December 14, 2001 || Socorro || LINEAR || — || align=right | 1.2 km || 
|-id=661 bgcolor=#fefefe
| 205661 ||  || — || December 14, 2001 || Socorro || LINEAR || FLO || align=right | 1.3 km || 
|-id=662 bgcolor=#fefefe
| 205662 ||  || — || December 14, 2001 || Socorro || LINEAR || FLO || align=right | 1.1 km || 
|-id=663 bgcolor=#fefefe
| 205663 ||  || — || December 14, 2001 || Socorro || LINEAR || — || align=right | 1.2 km || 
|-id=664 bgcolor=#fefefe
| 205664 ||  || — || December 14, 2001 || Socorro || LINEAR || FLO || align=right | 1.0 km || 
|-id=665 bgcolor=#fefefe
| 205665 ||  || — || December 14, 2001 || Socorro || LINEAR || — || align=right | 1.1 km || 
|-id=666 bgcolor=#fefefe
| 205666 ||  || — || December 14, 2001 || Socorro || LINEAR || — || align=right | 1.6 km || 
|-id=667 bgcolor=#fefefe
| 205667 ||  || — || December 14, 2001 || Socorro || LINEAR || — || align=right data-sort-value="0.98" | 980 m || 
|-id=668 bgcolor=#fefefe
| 205668 ||  || — || December 14, 2001 || Socorro || LINEAR || — || align=right | 1.3 km || 
|-id=669 bgcolor=#fefefe
| 205669 ||  || — || December 14, 2001 || Socorro || LINEAR || V || align=right | 1.00 km || 
|-id=670 bgcolor=#fefefe
| 205670 ||  || — || December 14, 2001 || Socorro || LINEAR || V || align=right data-sort-value="0.89" | 890 m || 
|-id=671 bgcolor=#fefefe
| 205671 ||  || — || December 14, 2001 || Socorro || LINEAR || — || align=right | 1.2 km || 
|-id=672 bgcolor=#fefefe
| 205672 ||  || — || December 14, 2001 || Socorro || LINEAR || FLO || align=right | 1.2 km || 
|-id=673 bgcolor=#fefefe
| 205673 ||  || — || December 15, 2001 || Socorro || LINEAR || FLO || align=right data-sort-value="0.76" | 760 m || 
|-id=674 bgcolor=#fefefe
| 205674 ||  || — || December 15, 2001 || Socorro || LINEAR || — || align=right | 1.2 km || 
|-id=675 bgcolor=#fefefe
| 205675 ||  || — || December 15, 2001 || Socorro || LINEAR || — || align=right data-sort-value="0.74" | 740 m || 
|-id=676 bgcolor=#fefefe
| 205676 ||  || — || December 14, 2001 || Socorro || LINEAR || — || align=right | 1.2 km || 
|-id=677 bgcolor=#fefefe
| 205677 ||  || — || December 14, 2001 || Socorro || LINEAR || — || align=right | 1.2 km || 
|-id=678 bgcolor=#fefefe
| 205678 ||  || — || December 14, 2001 || Socorro || LINEAR || — || align=right | 1.8 km || 
|-id=679 bgcolor=#fefefe
| 205679 ||  || — || December 18, 2001 || Socorro || LINEAR || — || align=right | 1.0 km || 
|-id=680 bgcolor=#fefefe
| 205680 ||  || — || December 17, 2001 || Socorro || LINEAR || — || align=right | 2.9 km || 
|-id=681 bgcolor=#fefefe
| 205681 ||  || — || December 20, 2001 || Kitt Peak || Spacewatch || — || align=right data-sort-value="0.91" | 910 m || 
|-id=682 bgcolor=#fefefe
| 205682 ||  || — || December 17, 2001 || Socorro || LINEAR || — || align=right | 1.3 km || 
|-id=683 bgcolor=#fefefe
| 205683 ||  || — || December 18, 2001 || Socorro || LINEAR || — || align=right | 1.1 km || 
|-id=684 bgcolor=#fefefe
| 205684 ||  || — || December 18, 2001 || Socorro || LINEAR || — || align=right | 1.2 km || 
|-id=685 bgcolor=#fefefe
| 205685 ||  || — || December 18, 2001 || Socorro || LINEAR || FLO || align=right | 1.2 km || 
|-id=686 bgcolor=#fefefe
| 205686 ||  || — || December 17, 2001 || Palomar || NEAT || — || align=right | 2.4 km || 
|-id=687 bgcolor=#fefefe
| 205687 ||  || — || December 17, 2001 || Socorro || LINEAR || FLO || align=right data-sort-value="0.94" | 940 m || 
|-id=688 bgcolor=#fefefe
| 205688 ||  || — || December 18, 2001 || Anderson Mesa || LONEOS || — || align=right | 2.4 km || 
|-id=689 bgcolor=#fefefe
| 205689 ||  || — || December 19, 2001 || Socorro || LINEAR || PHO || align=right | 2.4 km || 
|-id=690 bgcolor=#fefefe
| 205690 ||  || — || December 17, 2001 || Socorro || LINEAR || FLO || align=right | 1.3 km || 
|-id=691 bgcolor=#fefefe
| 205691 ||  || — || December 17, 2001 || Socorro || LINEAR || — || align=right | 1.1 km || 
|-id=692 bgcolor=#fefefe
| 205692 ||  || — || December 17, 2001 || Socorro || LINEAR || — || align=right | 1.4 km || 
|-id=693 bgcolor=#fefefe
| 205693 ||  || — || December 17, 2001 || Socorro || LINEAR || — || align=right | 1.4 km || 
|-id=694 bgcolor=#fefefe
| 205694 ||  || — || December 17, 2001 || Socorro || LINEAR || FLO || align=right | 1.1 km || 
|-id=695 bgcolor=#fefefe
| 205695 ||  || — || December 20, 2001 || Socorro || LINEAR || — || align=right | 1.5 km || 
|-id=696 bgcolor=#fefefe
| 205696 ||  || — || December 18, 2001 || Kitt Peak || Spacewatch || NYS || align=right data-sort-value="0.69" | 690 m || 
|-id=697 bgcolor=#fefefe
| 205697 ||  || — || December 19, 2001 || Palomar || NEAT || FLO || align=right data-sort-value="0.82" | 820 m || 
|-id=698 bgcolor=#FA8072
| 205698 Troiani ||  ||  || January 8, 2002 || Desert Moon || B. L. Stevens || PHO || align=right | 1.5 km || 
|-id=699 bgcolor=#fefefe
| 205699 ||  || — || January 5, 2002 || Kitt Peak || Spacewatch || — || align=right | 1.1 km || 
|-id=700 bgcolor=#fefefe
| 205700 ||  || — || January 10, 2002 || Campo Imperatore || CINEOS || — || align=right | 1.3 km || 
|}

205701–205800 

|-bgcolor=#fefefe
| 205701 ||  || — || January 11, 2002 || Campo Imperatore || CINEOS || — || align=right | 1.2 km || 
|-id=702 bgcolor=#fefefe
| 205702 ||  || — || January 4, 2002 || Haleakala || NEAT || — || align=right | 1.6 km || 
|-id=703 bgcolor=#fefefe
| 205703 ||  || — || January 5, 2002 || Haleakala || NEAT || FLO || align=right | 1.1 km || 
|-id=704 bgcolor=#fefefe
| 205704 ||  || — || January 9, 2002 || Socorro || LINEAR || FLO || align=right data-sort-value="0.91" | 910 m || 
|-id=705 bgcolor=#fefefe
| 205705 ||  || — || January 6, 2002 || Kitt Peak || Spacewatch || — || align=right | 1.1 km || 
|-id=706 bgcolor=#fefefe
| 205706 ||  || — || January 8, 2002 || Socorro || LINEAR || — || align=right | 1.0 km || 
|-id=707 bgcolor=#fefefe
| 205707 ||  || — || January 8, 2002 || Socorro || LINEAR || — || align=right | 1.3 km || 
|-id=708 bgcolor=#fefefe
| 205708 ||  || — || January 9, 2002 || Socorro || LINEAR || — || align=right | 1.2 km || 
|-id=709 bgcolor=#fefefe
| 205709 ||  || — || January 9, 2002 || Socorro || LINEAR || V || align=right data-sort-value="0.95" | 950 m || 
|-id=710 bgcolor=#fefefe
| 205710 ||  || — || January 9, 2002 || Socorro || LINEAR || FLO || align=right data-sort-value="0.84" | 840 m || 
|-id=711 bgcolor=#fefefe
| 205711 ||  || — || January 11, 2002 || Socorro || LINEAR || — || align=right | 1.6 km || 
|-id=712 bgcolor=#fefefe
| 205712 ||  || — || January 12, 2002 || Socorro || LINEAR || — || align=right data-sort-value="0.85" | 850 m || 
|-id=713 bgcolor=#fefefe
| 205713 ||  || — || January 8, 2002 || Socorro || LINEAR || — || align=right | 2.8 km || 
|-id=714 bgcolor=#fefefe
| 205714 ||  || — || January 8, 2002 || Socorro || LINEAR || — || align=right | 1.1 km || 
|-id=715 bgcolor=#fefefe
| 205715 ||  || — || January 8, 2002 || Socorro || LINEAR || — || align=right data-sort-value="0.97" | 970 m || 
|-id=716 bgcolor=#fefefe
| 205716 ||  || — || January 8, 2002 || Socorro || LINEAR || FLO || align=right data-sort-value="0.82" | 820 m || 
|-id=717 bgcolor=#fefefe
| 205717 ||  || — || January 9, 2002 || Socorro || LINEAR || — || align=right | 1.7 km || 
|-id=718 bgcolor=#fefefe
| 205718 ||  || — || January 9, 2002 || Socorro || LINEAR || FLO || align=right data-sort-value="0.87" | 870 m || 
|-id=719 bgcolor=#fefefe
| 205719 ||  || — || January 9, 2002 || Socorro || LINEAR || — || align=right | 1.2 km || 
|-id=720 bgcolor=#fefefe
| 205720 ||  || — || January 11, 2002 || Socorro || LINEAR || — || align=right | 2.3 km || 
|-id=721 bgcolor=#fefefe
| 205721 ||  || — || January 8, 2002 || Socorro || LINEAR || — || align=right | 1.1 km || 
|-id=722 bgcolor=#fefefe
| 205722 ||  || — || January 8, 2002 || Socorro || LINEAR || ERI || align=right | 2.3 km || 
|-id=723 bgcolor=#fefefe
| 205723 ||  || — || January 9, 2002 || Socorro || LINEAR || MAS || align=right | 1.2 km || 
|-id=724 bgcolor=#fefefe
| 205724 ||  || — || January 9, 2002 || Socorro || LINEAR || — || align=right data-sort-value="0.87" | 870 m || 
|-id=725 bgcolor=#fefefe
| 205725 ||  || — || January 9, 2002 || Socorro || LINEAR || FLO || align=right | 1.1 km || 
|-id=726 bgcolor=#fefefe
| 205726 ||  || — || January 9, 2002 || Socorro || LINEAR || NYS || align=right data-sort-value="0.91" | 910 m || 
|-id=727 bgcolor=#fefefe
| 205727 ||  || — || January 9, 2002 || Socorro || LINEAR || — || align=right | 1.2 km || 
|-id=728 bgcolor=#fefefe
| 205728 ||  || — || January 13, 2002 || Socorro || LINEAR || — || align=right | 1.4 km || 
|-id=729 bgcolor=#fefefe
| 205729 ||  || — || January 14, 2002 || Socorro || LINEAR || — || align=right | 1.1 km || 
|-id=730 bgcolor=#fefefe
| 205730 ||  || — || January 14, 2002 || Socorro || LINEAR || V || align=right data-sort-value="0.92" | 920 m || 
|-id=731 bgcolor=#fefefe
| 205731 ||  || — || January 14, 2002 || Socorro || LINEAR || — || align=right | 1.5 km || 
|-id=732 bgcolor=#fefefe
| 205732 ||  || — || January 14, 2002 || Socorro || LINEAR || MAS || align=right | 1.1 km || 
|-id=733 bgcolor=#fefefe
| 205733 ||  || — || January 13, 2002 || Socorro || LINEAR || — || align=right | 1.1 km || 
|-id=734 bgcolor=#fefefe
| 205734 ||  || — || January 13, 2002 || Socorro || LINEAR || — || align=right | 1.1 km || 
|-id=735 bgcolor=#fefefe
| 205735 ||  || — || January 13, 2002 || Socorro || LINEAR || — || align=right | 1.1 km || 
|-id=736 bgcolor=#fefefe
| 205736 ||  || — || January 14, 2002 || Socorro || LINEAR || FLO || align=right data-sort-value="0.78" | 780 m || 
|-id=737 bgcolor=#fefefe
| 205737 ||  || — || January 14, 2002 || Socorro || LINEAR || — || align=right data-sort-value="0.87" | 870 m || 
|-id=738 bgcolor=#fefefe
| 205738 ||  || — || January 14, 2002 || Socorro || LINEAR || V || align=right data-sort-value="0.95" | 950 m || 
|-id=739 bgcolor=#fefefe
| 205739 ||  || — || January 12, 2002 || Palomar || NEAT || NYS || align=right data-sort-value="0.75" | 750 m || 
|-id=740 bgcolor=#fefefe
| 205740 ||  || — || January 14, 2002 || Socorro || LINEAR || — || align=right | 1.3 km || 
|-id=741 bgcolor=#fefefe
| 205741 ||  || — || January 14, 2002 || Socorro || LINEAR || FLO || align=right data-sort-value="0.89" | 890 m || 
|-id=742 bgcolor=#fefefe
| 205742 ||  || — || January 19, 2002 || Socorro || LINEAR || — || align=right | 1.1 km || 
|-id=743 bgcolor=#fefefe
| 205743 ||  || — || January 19, 2002 || Socorro || LINEAR || — || align=right data-sort-value="0.99" | 990 m || 
|-id=744 bgcolor=#FFC2E0
| 205744 ||  || — || January 25, 2002 || Palomar || NEAT || APO +1kmPHAcritical || align=right data-sort-value="0.81" | 810 m || 
|-id=745 bgcolor=#fefefe
| 205745 ||  || — || February 7, 2002 || Socorro || LINEAR || — || align=right | 2.5 km || 
|-id=746 bgcolor=#fefefe
| 205746 ||  || — || February 9, 2002 || Desert Eagle || W. K. Y. Yeung || — || align=right | 1.3 km || 
|-id=747 bgcolor=#fefefe
| 205747 ||  || — || February 6, 2002 || Socorro || LINEAR || V || align=right | 1.2 km || 
|-id=748 bgcolor=#fefefe
| 205748 ||  || — || February 6, 2002 || Socorro || LINEAR || — || align=right | 1.8 km || 
|-id=749 bgcolor=#fefefe
| 205749 ||  || — || February 6, 2002 || Socorro || LINEAR || V || align=right | 1.4 km || 
|-id=750 bgcolor=#fefefe
| 205750 ||  || — || February 6, 2002 || Socorro || LINEAR || NYS || align=right data-sort-value="0.77" | 770 m || 
|-id=751 bgcolor=#fefefe
| 205751 ||  || — || February 4, 2002 || Palomar || NEAT || — || align=right | 1.8 km || 
|-id=752 bgcolor=#fefefe
| 205752 ||  || — || February 5, 2002 || Palomar || NEAT || — || align=right | 1.3 km || 
|-id=753 bgcolor=#fefefe
| 205753 ||  || — || February 5, 2002 || Palomar || NEAT || FLO || align=right | 1.1 km || 
|-id=754 bgcolor=#fefefe
| 205754 ||  || — || February 6, 2002 || Palomar || NEAT || FLO || align=right | 1.2 km || 
|-id=755 bgcolor=#fefefe
| 205755 ||  || — || February 7, 2002 || Socorro || LINEAR || PHO || align=right | 1.6 km || 
|-id=756 bgcolor=#fefefe
| 205756 ||  || — || February 6, 2002 || Socorro || LINEAR || FLO || align=right | 1.1 km || 
|-id=757 bgcolor=#fefefe
| 205757 ||  || — || February 6, 2002 || Socorro || LINEAR || — || align=right | 1.2 km || 
|-id=758 bgcolor=#fefefe
| 205758 ||  || — || February 6, 2002 || Socorro || LINEAR || — || align=right | 1.3 km || 
|-id=759 bgcolor=#fefefe
| 205759 ||  || — || February 6, 2002 || Socorro || LINEAR || — || align=right | 1.4 km || 
|-id=760 bgcolor=#fefefe
| 205760 ||  || — || February 6, 2002 || Socorro || LINEAR || — || align=right | 1.3 km || 
|-id=761 bgcolor=#fefefe
| 205761 ||  || — || February 6, 2002 || Socorro || LINEAR || — || align=right | 1.7 km || 
|-id=762 bgcolor=#fefefe
| 205762 ||  || — || February 6, 2002 || Socorro || LINEAR || — || align=right | 1.4 km || 
|-id=763 bgcolor=#fefefe
| 205763 ||  || — || February 7, 2002 || Socorro || LINEAR || FLO || align=right | 1.6 km || 
|-id=764 bgcolor=#fefefe
| 205764 ||  || — || February 7, 2002 || Socorro || LINEAR || NYS || align=right data-sort-value="0.88" | 880 m || 
|-id=765 bgcolor=#fefefe
| 205765 ||  || — || February 7, 2002 || Socorro || LINEAR || V || align=right | 1.1 km || 
|-id=766 bgcolor=#fefefe
| 205766 ||  || — || February 7, 2002 || Socorro || LINEAR || — || align=right | 1.0 km || 
|-id=767 bgcolor=#fefefe
| 205767 ||  || — || February 6, 2002 || Socorro || LINEAR || V || align=right | 1.0 km || 
|-id=768 bgcolor=#fefefe
| 205768 ||  || — || February 7, 2002 || Socorro || LINEAR || — || align=right | 1.3 km || 
|-id=769 bgcolor=#fefefe
| 205769 ||  || — || February 6, 2002 || Socorro || LINEAR || — || align=right | 1.2 km || 
|-id=770 bgcolor=#fefefe
| 205770 ||  || — || February 6, 2002 || Socorro || LINEAR || — || align=right | 1.6 km || 
|-id=771 bgcolor=#fefefe
| 205771 ||  || — || February 7, 2002 || Socorro || LINEAR || NYS || align=right data-sort-value="0.89" | 890 m || 
|-id=772 bgcolor=#fefefe
| 205772 ||  || — || February 7, 2002 || Socorro || LINEAR || — || align=right | 1.3 km || 
|-id=773 bgcolor=#fefefe
| 205773 ||  || — || February 7, 2002 || Socorro || LINEAR || — || align=right | 1.2 km || 
|-id=774 bgcolor=#fefefe
| 205774 ||  || — || February 7, 2002 || Socorro || LINEAR || V || align=right data-sort-value="0.77" | 770 m || 
|-id=775 bgcolor=#fefefe
| 205775 ||  || — || February 7, 2002 || Socorro || LINEAR || V || align=right data-sort-value="0.99" | 990 m || 
|-id=776 bgcolor=#fefefe
| 205776 ||  || — || February 7, 2002 || Socorro || LINEAR || V || align=right | 1.0 km || 
|-id=777 bgcolor=#fefefe
| 205777 ||  || — || February 7, 2002 || Socorro || LINEAR || NYS || align=right | 1.9 km || 
|-id=778 bgcolor=#fefefe
| 205778 ||  || — || February 7, 2002 || Socorro || LINEAR || V || align=right data-sort-value="0.97" | 970 m || 
|-id=779 bgcolor=#fefefe
| 205779 ||  || — || February 7, 2002 || Socorro || LINEAR || FLO || align=right data-sort-value="0.99" | 990 m || 
|-id=780 bgcolor=#fefefe
| 205780 ||  || — || February 7, 2002 || Socorro || LINEAR || — || align=right | 1.5 km || 
|-id=781 bgcolor=#fefefe
| 205781 ||  || — || February 7, 2002 || Socorro || LINEAR || V || align=right | 1.1 km || 
|-id=782 bgcolor=#fefefe
| 205782 ||  || — || February 7, 2002 || Socorro || LINEAR || MAS || align=right | 1.1 km || 
|-id=783 bgcolor=#fefefe
| 205783 ||  || — || February 7, 2002 || Socorro || LINEAR || — || align=right | 1.4 km || 
|-id=784 bgcolor=#fefefe
| 205784 ||  || — || February 7, 2002 || Socorro || LINEAR || FLO || align=right | 1.1 km || 
|-id=785 bgcolor=#fefefe
| 205785 ||  || — || February 7, 2002 || Socorro || LINEAR || FLO || align=right data-sort-value="0.93" | 930 m || 
|-id=786 bgcolor=#fefefe
| 205786 ||  || — || February 7, 2002 || Socorro || LINEAR || V || align=right | 1.3 km || 
|-id=787 bgcolor=#fefefe
| 205787 ||  || — || February 7, 2002 || Socorro || LINEAR || — || align=right | 1.4 km || 
|-id=788 bgcolor=#fefefe
| 205788 ||  || — || February 7, 2002 || Socorro || LINEAR || FLO || align=right | 1.1 km || 
|-id=789 bgcolor=#fefefe
| 205789 ||  || — || February 7, 2002 || Socorro || LINEAR || FLO || align=right | 1.1 km || 
|-id=790 bgcolor=#fefefe
| 205790 ||  || — || February 7, 2002 || Socorro || LINEAR || ERI || align=right | 2.7 km || 
|-id=791 bgcolor=#fefefe
| 205791 ||  || — || February 7, 2002 || Socorro || LINEAR || NYS || align=right data-sort-value="0.96" | 960 m || 
|-id=792 bgcolor=#fefefe
| 205792 ||  || — || February 7, 2002 || Socorro || LINEAR || — || align=right | 1.3 km || 
|-id=793 bgcolor=#fefefe
| 205793 ||  || — || February 7, 2002 || Socorro || LINEAR || NYS || align=right data-sort-value="0.63" | 630 m || 
|-id=794 bgcolor=#fefefe
| 205794 ||  || — || February 7, 2002 || Socorro || LINEAR || — || align=right data-sort-value="0.88" | 880 m || 
|-id=795 bgcolor=#fefefe
| 205795 ||  || — || February 7, 2002 || Socorro || LINEAR || V || align=right | 1.1 km || 
|-id=796 bgcolor=#fefefe
| 205796 ||  || — || February 8, 2002 || Socorro || LINEAR || FLO || align=right | 1.2 km || 
|-id=797 bgcolor=#fefefe
| 205797 ||  || — || February 8, 2002 || Socorro || LINEAR || ERI || align=right | 3.0 km || 
|-id=798 bgcolor=#fefefe
| 205798 ||  || — || February 7, 2002 || Kitt Peak || Spacewatch || — || align=right | 1.2 km || 
|-id=799 bgcolor=#fefefe
| 205799 ||  || — || February 7, 2002 || Socorro || LINEAR || FLO || align=right data-sort-value="0.95" | 950 m || 
|-id=800 bgcolor=#fefefe
| 205800 ||  || — || February 7, 2002 || Socorro || LINEAR || MAS || align=right data-sort-value="0.91" | 910 m || 
|}

205801–205900 

|-bgcolor=#fefefe
| 205801 ||  || — || February 8, 2002 || Socorro || LINEAR || — || align=right | 1.4 km || 
|-id=802 bgcolor=#fefefe
| 205802 ||  || — || February 8, 2002 || Socorro || LINEAR || — || align=right | 1.5 km || 
|-id=803 bgcolor=#fefefe
| 205803 ||  || — || February 8, 2002 || Socorro || LINEAR || FLO || align=right | 1.3 km || 
|-id=804 bgcolor=#fefefe
| 205804 ||  || — || February 8, 2002 || Socorro || LINEAR || NYS || align=right data-sort-value="0.97" | 970 m || 
|-id=805 bgcolor=#fefefe
| 205805 ||  || — || February 8, 2002 || Socorro || LINEAR || — || align=right | 1.5 km || 
|-id=806 bgcolor=#fefefe
| 205806 ||  || — || February 8, 2002 || Socorro || LINEAR || — || align=right | 1.7 km || 
|-id=807 bgcolor=#fefefe
| 205807 ||  || — || February 8, 2002 || Socorro || LINEAR || — || align=right | 1.7 km || 
|-id=808 bgcolor=#fefefe
| 205808 ||  || — || February 8, 2002 || Socorro || LINEAR || ERI || align=right | 1.7 km || 
|-id=809 bgcolor=#fefefe
| 205809 ||  || — || February 10, 2002 || Socorro || LINEAR || — || align=right | 1.1 km || 
|-id=810 bgcolor=#fefefe
| 205810 ||  || — || February 10, 2002 || Socorro || LINEAR || — || align=right | 1.2 km || 
|-id=811 bgcolor=#fefefe
| 205811 ||  || — || February 10, 2002 || Socorro || LINEAR || — || align=right | 1.4 km || 
|-id=812 bgcolor=#fefefe
| 205812 ||  || — || February 10, 2002 || Socorro || LINEAR || V || align=right | 1.0 km || 
|-id=813 bgcolor=#fefefe
| 205813 ||  || — || February 10, 2002 || Socorro || LINEAR || — || align=right | 1.3 km || 
|-id=814 bgcolor=#fefefe
| 205814 ||  || — || February 10, 2002 || Socorro || LINEAR || NYS || align=right | 1.0 km || 
|-id=815 bgcolor=#fefefe
| 205815 ||  || — || February 10, 2002 || Socorro || LINEAR || — || align=right | 1.1 km || 
|-id=816 bgcolor=#fefefe
| 205816 ||  || — || February 10, 2002 || Socorro || LINEAR || NYS || align=right data-sort-value="0.86" | 860 m || 
|-id=817 bgcolor=#fefefe
| 205817 ||  || — || February 10, 2002 || Socorro || LINEAR || — || align=right | 2.1 km || 
|-id=818 bgcolor=#fefefe
| 205818 ||  || — || February 10, 2002 || Socorro || LINEAR || — || align=right | 1.1 km || 
|-id=819 bgcolor=#fefefe
| 205819 ||  || — || February 11, 2002 || Socorro || LINEAR || NYS || align=right data-sort-value="0.84" | 840 m || 
|-id=820 bgcolor=#fefefe
| 205820 ||  || — || February 11, 2002 || Socorro || LINEAR || — || align=right data-sort-value="0.99" | 990 m || 
|-id=821 bgcolor=#fefefe
| 205821 ||  || — || February 13, 2002 || Kitt Peak || Spacewatch || — || align=right data-sort-value="0.87" | 870 m || 
|-id=822 bgcolor=#fefefe
| 205822 ||  || — || February 6, 2002 || Haleakala || NEAT || — || align=right | 1.3 km || 
|-id=823 bgcolor=#fefefe
| 205823 ||  || — || February 8, 2002 || Kitt Peak || M. W. Buie || V || align=right data-sort-value="0.92" | 920 m || 
|-id=824 bgcolor=#fefefe
| 205824 ||  || — || February 7, 2002 || Kitt Peak || Spacewatch || — || align=right | 1.2 km || 
|-id=825 bgcolor=#fefefe
| 205825 ||  || — || February 7, 2002 || Palomar || NEAT || FLO || align=right data-sort-value="0.91" | 910 m || 
|-id=826 bgcolor=#fefefe
| 205826 ||  || — || February 8, 2002 || Kitt Peak || Spacewatch || — || align=right | 1.5 km || 
|-id=827 bgcolor=#fefefe
| 205827 ||  || — || February 10, 2002 || Socorro || LINEAR || — || align=right | 1.4 km || 
|-id=828 bgcolor=#fefefe
| 205828 ||  || — || February 13, 2002 || Kitt Peak || Spacewatch || — || align=right data-sort-value="0.91" | 910 m || 
|-id=829 bgcolor=#fefefe
| 205829 ||  || — || February 3, 2002 || Palomar || NEAT || FLO || align=right | 1.3 km || 
|-id=830 bgcolor=#fefefe
| 205830 ||  || — || February 20, 2002 || Socorro || LINEAR || NYS || align=right data-sort-value="0.96" | 960 m || 
|-id=831 bgcolor=#fefefe
| 205831 ||  || — || February 16, 2002 || Palomar || NEAT || NYS || align=right data-sort-value="0.76" | 760 m || 
|-id=832 bgcolor=#fefefe
| 205832 ||  || — || February 16, 2002 || Palomar || NEAT || — || align=right | 1.3 km || 
|-id=833 bgcolor=#fefefe
| 205833 || 2002 ES || — || March 5, 2002 || Desert Eagle || W. K. Y. Yeung || — || align=right | 1.4 km || 
|-id=834 bgcolor=#fefefe
| 205834 ||  || — || March 9, 2002 || Bohyunsan || Bohyunsan Obs. || — || align=right | 1.1 km || 
|-id=835 bgcolor=#fefefe
| 205835 ||  || — || March 14, 2002 || Prescott || P. G. Comba || — || align=right | 1.2 km || 
|-id=836 bgcolor=#fefefe
| 205836 ||  || — || March 11, 2002 || Palomar || NEAT || PHO || align=right | 1.7 km || 
|-id=837 bgcolor=#E9E9E9
| 205837 ||  || — || March 9, 2002 || Kitt Peak || Spacewatch || — || align=right | 1.1 km || 
|-id=838 bgcolor=#fefefe
| 205838 ||  || — || March 9, 2002 || Socorro || LINEAR || NYS || align=right data-sort-value="0.97" | 970 m || 
|-id=839 bgcolor=#fefefe
| 205839 ||  || — || March 10, 2002 || Haleakala || NEAT || — || align=right | 1.3 km || 
|-id=840 bgcolor=#fefefe
| 205840 ||  || — || March 10, 2002 || Anderson Mesa || LONEOS || V || align=right | 1.1 km || 
|-id=841 bgcolor=#fefefe
| 205841 ||  || — || March 9, 2002 || Socorro || LINEAR || MAS || align=right | 1.1 km || 
|-id=842 bgcolor=#fefefe
| 205842 ||  || — || March 9, 2002 || Palomar || NEAT || NYS || align=right data-sort-value="0.88" | 880 m || 
|-id=843 bgcolor=#fefefe
| 205843 ||  || — || March 11, 2002 || Palomar || NEAT || — || align=right | 1.2 km || 
|-id=844 bgcolor=#fefefe
| 205844 ||  || — || March 10, 2002 || Kitt Peak || Spacewatch || MAS || align=right data-sort-value="0.80" | 800 m || 
|-id=845 bgcolor=#fefefe
| 205845 ||  || — || March 9, 2002 || Socorro || LINEAR || NYS || align=right data-sort-value="0.97" | 970 m || 
|-id=846 bgcolor=#fefefe
| 205846 ||  || — || March 11, 2002 || Palomar || NEAT || — || align=right | 1.1 km || 
|-id=847 bgcolor=#fefefe
| 205847 ||  || — || March 11, 2002 || Palomar || NEAT || ERI || align=right | 2.2 km || 
|-id=848 bgcolor=#fefefe
| 205848 ||  || — || March 12, 2002 || Palomar || NEAT || NYS || align=right data-sort-value="0.66" | 660 m || 
|-id=849 bgcolor=#fefefe
| 205849 ||  || — || March 14, 2002 || Socorro || LINEAR || — || align=right | 1.1 km || 
|-id=850 bgcolor=#fefefe
| 205850 ||  || — || March 9, 2002 || Socorro || LINEAR || — || align=right data-sort-value="0.94" | 940 m || 
|-id=851 bgcolor=#fefefe
| 205851 ||  || — || March 13, 2002 || Socorro || LINEAR || V || align=right data-sort-value="0.98" | 980 m || 
|-id=852 bgcolor=#fefefe
| 205852 ||  || — || March 13, 2002 || Socorro || LINEAR || — || align=right | 1.1 km || 
|-id=853 bgcolor=#fefefe
| 205853 ||  || — || March 13, 2002 || Socorro || LINEAR || — || align=right data-sort-value="0.85" | 850 m || 
|-id=854 bgcolor=#fefefe
| 205854 ||  || — || March 13, 2002 || Socorro || LINEAR || NYS || align=right data-sort-value="0.94" | 940 m || 
|-id=855 bgcolor=#fefefe
| 205855 ||  || — || March 13, 2002 || Socorro || LINEAR || MAS || align=right | 1.1 km || 
|-id=856 bgcolor=#fefefe
| 205856 ||  || — || March 11, 2002 || Kitt Peak || Spacewatch || — || align=right | 1.6 km || 
|-id=857 bgcolor=#fefefe
| 205857 ||  || — || March 10, 2002 || Haleakala || NEAT || — || align=right | 1.1 km || 
|-id=858 bgcolor=#fefefe
| 205858 ||  || — || March 10, 2002 || Haleakala || NEAT || — || align=right | 1.5 km || 
|-id=859 bgcolor=#fefefe
| 205859 ||  || — || March 12, 2002 || Palomar || NEAT || — || align=right | 1.2 km || 
|-id=860 bgcolor=#fefefe
| 205860 ||  || — || March 12, 2002 || Palomar || NEAT || NYS || align=right | 1.0 km || 
|-id=861 bgcolor=#fefefe
| 205861 ||  || — || March 9, 2002 || Socorro || LINEAR || — || align=right | 1.3 km || 
|-id=862 bgcolor=#fefefe
| 205862 ||  || — || March 9, 2002 || Socorro || LINEAR || V || align=right | 1.1 km || 
|-id=863 bgcolor=#fefefe
| 205863 ||  || — || March 9, 2002 || Socorro || LINEAR || NYS || align=right | 1.3 km || 
|-id=864 bgcolor=#fefefe
| 205864 ||  || — || March 12, 2002 || Socorro || LINEAR || NYS || align=right data-sort-value="0.92" | 920 m || 
|-id=865 bgcolor=#fefefe
| 205865 ||  || — || March 14, 2002 || Socorro || LINEAR || FLO || align=right | 1.6 km || 
|-id=866 bgcolor=#fefefe
| 205866 ||  || — || March 14, 2002 || Socorro || LINEAR || MAS || align=right data-sort-value="0.94" | 940 m || 
|-id=867 bgcolor=#fefefe
| 205867 ||  || — || March 11, 2002 || Kitt Peak || Spacewatch || — || align=right | 1.2 km || 
|-id=868 bgcolor=#fefefe
| 205868 ||  || — || March 15, 2002 || Palomar || NEAT || V || align=right | 1.3 km || 
|-id=869 bgcolor=#fefefe
| 205869 ||  || — || March 9, 2002 || Catalina || CSS || NYS || align=right | 1.2 km || 
|-id=870 bgcolor=#fefefe
| 205870 ||  || — || March 9, 2002 || Anderson Mesa || LONEOS || — || align=right | 1.3 km || 
|-id=871 bgcolor=#fefefe
| 205871 ||  || — || March 9, 2002 || Socorro || LINEAR || — || align=right | 1.2 km || 
|-id=872 bgcolor=#fefefe
| 205872 ||  || — || March 9, 2002 || Anderson Mesa || LONEOS || — || align=right | 1.1 km || 
|-id=873 bgcolor=#fefefe
| 205873 ||  || — || March 9, 2002 || Anderson Mesa || LONEOS || — || align=right | 2.8 km || 
|-id=874 bgcolor=#fefefe
| 205874 ||  || — || March 9, 2002 || Anderson Mesa || LONEOS || V || align=right data-sort-value="0.95" | 950 m || 
|-id=875 bgcolor=#fefefe
| 205875 ||  || — || March 9, 2002 || Catalina || CSS || — || align=right | 1.5 km || 
|-id=876 bgcolor=#fefefe
| 205876 ||  || — || March 9, 2002 || Anderson Mesa || LONEOS || V || align=right | 1.2 km || 
|-id=877 bgcolor=#fefefe
| 205877 ||  || — || March 9, 2002 || Kitt Peak || Spacewatch || — || align=right | 1.3 km || 
|-id=878 bgcolor=#fefefe
| 205878 ||  || — || March 12, 2002 || Palomar || NEAT || MAS || align=right data-sort-value="0.91" | 910 m || 
|-id=879 bgcolor=#fefefe
| 205879 ||  || — || March 12, 2002 || Palomar || NEAT || — || align=right | 1.1 km || 
|-id=880 bgcolor=#fefefe
| 205880 ||  || — || March 12, 2002 || Palomar || NEAT || — || align=right | 1.2 km || 
|-id=881 bgcolor=#fefefe
| 205881 ||  || — || March 13, 2002 || Kitt Peak || Spacewatch || — || align=right data-sort-value="0.90" | 900 m || 
|-id=882 bgcolor=#fefefe
| 205882 ||  || — || March 14, 2002 || Anderson Mesa || LONEOS || NYS || align=right | 1.0 km || 
|-id=883 bgcolor=#fefefe
| 205883 ||  || — || March 5, 2002 || Anderson Mesa || LONEOS || FLO || align=right data-sort-value="0.90" | 900 m || 
|-id=884 bgcolor=#fefefe
| 205884 ||  || — || March 19, 2002 || Desert Eagle || W. K. Y. Yeung || — || align=right | 3.0 km || 
|-id=885 bgcolor=#fefefe
| 205885 ||  || — || March 16, 2002 || Socorro || LINEAR || ERI || align=right | 2.3 km || 
|-id=886 bgcolor=#fefefe
| 205886 ||  || — || March 16, 2002 || Haleakala || NEAT || MAS || align=right data-sort-value="0.97" | 970 m || 
|-id=887 bgcolor=#fefefe
| 205887 ||  || — || March 16, 2002 || Socorro || LINEAR || — || align=right | 1.1 km || 
|-id=888 bgcolor=#fefefe
| 205888 ||  || — || April 14, 2002 || Desert Eagle || W. K. Y. Yeung || — || align=right | 2.0 km || 
|-id=889 bgcolor=#fefefe
| 205889 ||  || — || April 1, 2002 || Bergisch Gladbach || W. Bickel || NYS || align=right | 1.1 km || 
|-id=890 bgcolor=#fefefe
| 205890 ||  || — || April 15, 2002 || Desert Eagle || W. K. Y. Yeung || FLO || align=right data-sort-value="0.97" | 970 m || 
|-id=891 bgcolor=#fefefe
| 205891 ||  || — || April 14, 2002 || Socorro || LINEAR || MAS || align=right | 1.0 km || 
|-id=892 bgcolor=#fefefe
| 205892 ||  || — || April 4, 2002 || Palomar || NEAT || — || align=right | 1.5 km || 
|-id=893 bgcolor=#fefefe
| 205893 ||  || — || April 4, 2002 || Haleakala || NEAT || — || align=right | 1.5 km || 
|-id=894 bgcolor=#fefefe
| 205894 ||  || — || April 5, 2002 || Palomar || NEAT || — || align=right | 1.5 km || 
|-id=895 bgcolor=#fefefe
| 205895 ||  || — || April 5, 2002 || Anderson Mesa || LONEOS || NYS || align=right | 1.0 km || 
|-id=896 bgcolor=#fefefe
| 205896 ||  || — || April 5, 2002 || Anderson Mesa || LONEOS || NYS || align=right | 1.1 km || 
|-id=897 bgcolor=#fefefe
| 205897 ||  || — || April 8, 2002 || Palomar || NEAT || NYS || align=right | 1.1 km || 
|-id=898 bgcolor=#fefefe
| 205898 ||  || — || April 8, 2002 || Palomar || NEAT || — || align=right | 1.1 km || 
|-id=899 bgcolor=#fefefe
| 205899 ||  || — || April 8, 2002 || Palomar || NEAT || — || align=right | 1.3 km || 
|-id=900 bgcolor=#fefefe
| 205900 ||  || — || April 8, 2002 || Palomar || NEAT || EUT || align=right data-sort-value="0.90" | 900 m || 
|}

205901–206000 

|-bgcolor=#fefefe
| 205901 ||  || — || April 9, 2002 || Anderson Mesa || LONEOS || — || align=right | 1.7 km || 
|-id=902 bgcolor=#fefefe
| 205902 ||  || — || April 9, 2002 || Palomar || NEAT || MAS || align=right | 1.3 km || 
|-id=903 bgcolor=#fefefe
| 205903 ||  || — || April 9, 2002 || Kitt Peak || Spacewatch || NYS || align=right data-sort-value="0.95" | 950 m || 
|-id=904 bgcolor=#fefefe
| 205904 ||  || — || April 9, 2002 || Kitt Peak || Spacewatch || NYS || align=right data-sort-value="0.97" | 970 m || 
|-id=905 bgcolor=#fefefe
| 205905 ||  || — || April 9, 2002 || Socorro || LINEAR || — || align=right | 1.4 km || 
|-id=906 bgcolor=#fefefe
| 205906 ||  || — || April 10, 2002 || Socorro || LINEAR || — || align=right | 1.3 km || 
|-id=907 bgcolor=#fefefe
| 205907 ||  || — || April 10, 2002 || Socorro || LINEAR || — || align=right | 1.3 km || 
|-id=908 bgcolor=#fefefe
| 205908 ||  || — || April 9, 2002 || Socorro || LINEAR || — || align=right | 1.4 km || 
|-id=909 bgcolor=#fefefe
| 205909 ||  || — || April 9, 2002 || Kitt Peak || Spacewatch || — || align=right | 1.1 km || 
|-id=910 bgcolor=#fefefe
| 205910 ||  || — || April 10, 2002 || Socorro || LINEAR || NYS || align=right data-sort-value="0.79" | 790 m || 
|-id=911 bgcolor=#fefefe
| 205911 ||  || — || April 10, 2002 || Socorro || LINEAR || V || align=right | 1.0 km || 
|-id=912 bgcolor=#fefefe
| 205912 ||  || — || April 11, 2002 || Socorro || LINEAR || NYS || align=right | 1.8 km || 
|-id=913 bgcolor=#fefefe
| 205913 ||  || — || April 10, 2002 || Socorro || LINEAR || V || align=right data-sort-value="0.95" | 950 m || 
|-id=914 bgcolor=#E9E9E9
| 205914 ||  || — || April 10, 2002 || Socorro || LINEAR || — || align=right | 1.5 km || 
|-id=915 bgcolor=#E9E9E9
| 205915 ||  || — || April 12, 2002 || Palomar || NEAT || — || align=right | 3.5 km || 
|-id=916 bgcolor=#fefefe
| 205916 ||  || — || April 12, 2002 || Socorro || LINEAR || — || align=right | 1.3 km || 
|-id=917 bgcolor=#fefefe
| 205917 ||  || — || April 12, 2002 || Socorro || LINEAR || — || align=right | 1.1 km || 
|-id=918 bgcolor=#fefefe
| 205918 ||  || — || April 12, 2002 || Socorro || LINEAR || — || align=right data-sort-value="0.91" | 910 m || 
|-id=919 bgcolor=#fefefe
| 205919 ||  || — || April 13, 2002 || Palomar || NEAT || FLO || align=right data-sort-value="0.95" | 950 m || 
|-id=920 bgcolor=#fefefe
| 205920 ||  || — || April 13, 2002 || Kitt Peak || Spacewatch || NYS || align=right data-sort-value="0.99" | 990 m || 
|-id=921 bgcolor=#fefefe
| 205921 ||  || — || April 14, 2002 || Haleakala || NEAT || — || align=right | 2.9 km || 
|-id=922 bgcolor=#fefefe
| 205922 ||  || — || April 9, 2002 || Socorro || LINEAR || — || align=right | 1.3 km || 
|-id=923 bgcolor=#fefefe
| 205923 ||  || — || April 10, 2002 || Socorro || LINEAR || V || align=right | 1.0 km || 
|-id=924 bgcolor=#fefefe
| 205924 ||  || — || April 20, 2002 || Socorro || LINEAR || PHO || align=right | 2.2 km || 
|-id=925 bgcolor=#fefefe
| 205925 ||  || — || April 16, 2002 || Socorro || LINEAR || — || align=right | 1.5 km || 
|-id=926 bgcolor=#fefefe
| 205926 ||  || — || April 22, 2002 || Socorro || LINEAR || PHO || align=right | 2.1 km || 
|-id=927 bgcolor=#fefefe
| 205927 ||  || — || May 7, 2002 || Socorro || LINEAR || H || align=right | 1.0 km || 
|-id=928 bgcolor=#fefefe
| 205928 ||  || — || May 6, 2002 || Anderson Mesa || LONEOS || NYS || align=right | 1.2 km || 
|-id=929 bgcolor=#fefefe
| 205929 ||  || — || May 7, 2002 || Palomar || NEAT || MAS || align=right | 1.0 km || 
|-id=930 bgcolor=#fefefe
| 205930 ||  || — || May 7, 2002 || Palomar || NEAT || V || align=right | 1.2 km || 
|-id=931 bgcolor=#E9E9E9
| 205931 ||  || — || May 6, 2002 || Palomar || NEAT || — || align=right | 1.9 km || 
|-id=932 bgcolor=#fefefe
| 205932 ||  || — || May 7, 2002 || Socorro || LINEAR || — || align=right | 1.8 km || 
|-id=933 bgcolor=#fefefe
| 205933 ||  || — || May 8, 2002 || Socorro || LINEAR || ERI || align=right | 3.7 km || 
|-id=934 bgcolor=#fefefe
| 205934 ||  || — || May 9, 2002 || Socorro || LINEAR || — || align=right | 1.4 km || 
|-id=935 bgcolor=#E9E9E9
| 205935 ||  || — || May 9, 2002 || Socorro || LINEAR || — || align=right | 3.0 km || 
|-id=936 bgcolor=#fefefe
| 205936 ||  || — || May 9, 2002 || Socorro || LINEAR || — || align=right | 1.7 km || 
|-id=937 bgcolor=#fefefe
| 205937 ||  || — || May 10, 2002 || Desert Eagle || W. K. Y. Yeung || — || align=right | 1.8 km || 
|-id=938 bgcolor=#fefefe
| 205938 ||  || — || May 8, 2002 || Socorro || LINEAR || NYS || align=right data-sort-value="0.82" | 820 m || 
|-id=939 bgcolor=#fefefe
| 205939 ||  || — || May 8, 2002 || Socorro || LINEAR || NYS || align=right | 1.2 km || 
|-id=940 bgcolor=#fefefe
| 205940 ||  || — || May 9, 2002 || Socorro || LINEAR || ERI || align=right | 2.5 km || 
|-id=941 bgcolor=#fefefe
| 205941 ||  || — || May 9, 2002 || Socorro || LINEAR || — || align=right | 1.1 km || 
|-id=942 bgcolor=#fefefe
| 205942 ||  || — || May 9, 2002 || Socorro || LINEAR || NYS || align=right | 1.0 km || 
|-id=943 bgcolor=#fefefe
| 205943 ||  || — || May 9, 2002 || Socorro || LINEAR || — || align=right | 1.1 km || 
|-id=944 bgcolor=#fefefe
| 205944 ||  || — || May 8, 2002 || Socorro || LINEAR || ERI || align=right | 2.7 km || 
|-id=945 bgcolor=#fefefe
| 205945 ||  || — || May 8, 2002 || Socorro || LINEAR || ERI || align=right | 2.1 km || 
|-id=946 bgcolor=#fefefe
| 205946 ||  || — || May 11, 2002 || Socorro || LINEAR || V || align=right | 1.1 km || 
|-id=947 bgcolor=#E9E9E9
| 205947 ||  || — || May 11, 2002 || Socorro || LINEAR || — || align=right | 1.2 km || 
|-id=948 bgcolor=#fefefe
| 205948 ||  || — || May 11, 2002 || Socorro || LINEAR || — || align=right | 1.4 km || 
|-id=949 bgcolor=#fefefe
| 205949 ||  || — || May 11, 2002 || Socorro || LINEAR || NYS || align=right | 1.0 km || 
|-id=950 bgcolor=#fefefe
| 205950 ||  || — || May 11, 2002 || Socorro || LINEAR || NYS || align=right | 2.6 km || 
|-id=951 bgcolor=#fefefe
| 205951 ||  || — || May 10, 2002 || Socorro || LINEAR || NYS || align=right | 1.0 km || 
|-id=952 bgcolor=#fefefe
| 205952 ||  || — || May 5, 2002 || Palomar || NEAT || — || align=right | 1.4 km || 
|-id=953 bgcolor=#E9E9E9
| 205953 ||  || — || May 6, 2002 || Anderson Mesa || LONEOS || — || align=right | 1.3 km || 
|-id=954 bgcolor=#fefefe
| 205954 ||  || — || May 6, 2002 || Palomar || NEAT || H || align=right data-sort-value="0.88" | 880 m || 
|-id=955 bgcolor=#fefefe
| 205955 ||  || — || May 9, 2002 || Socorro || LINEAR || — || align=right | 1.6 km || 
|-id=956 bgcolor=#fefefe
| 205956 ||  || — || May 9, 2002 || Palomar || NEAT || MAS || align=right data-sort-value="0.93" | 930 m || 
|-id=957 bgcolor=#fefefe
| 205957 ||  || — || May 11, 2002 || Socorro || LINEAR || NYS || align=right data-sort-value="0.88" | 880 m || 
|-id=958 bgcolor=#fefefe
| 205958 ||  || — || May 16, 2002 || Socorro || LINEAR || — || align=right | 1.5 km || 
|-id=959 bgcolor=#fefefe
| 205959 ||  || — || May 16, 2002 || Socorro || LINEAR || NYS || align=right | 1.0 km || 
|-id=960 bgcolor=#E9E9E9
| 205960 ||  || — || May 30, 2002 || Palomar || NEAT || — || align=right | 1.5 km || 
|-id=961 bgcolor=#E9E9E9
| 205961 ||  || — || May 23, 2002 || Palomar || NEAT || — || align=right | 1.3 km || 
|-id=962 bgcolor=#fefefe
| 205962 ||  || — || June 5, 2002 || Socorro || LINEAR || NYS || align=right | 1.1 km || 
|-id=963 bgcolor=#fefefe
| 205963 ||  || — || June 6, 2002 || Socorro || LINEAR || NYS || align=right data-sort-value="0.96" | 960 m || 
|-id=964 bgcolor=#E9E9E9
| 205964 ||  || — || June 6, 2002 || Socorro || LINEAR || — || align=right | 3.8 km || 
|-id=965 bgcolor=#E9E9E9
| 205965 ||  || — || June 9, 2002 || Socorro || LINEAR || — || align=right | 5.6 km || 
|-id=966 bgcolor=#E9E9E9
| 205966 ||  || — || June 9, 2002 || Haleakala || NEAT || — || align=right | 4.2 km || 
|-id=967 bgcolor=#E9E9E9
| 205967 ||  || — || June 10, 2002 || Socorro || LINEAR || EUN || align=right | 1.9 km || 
|-id=968 bgcolor=#fefefe
| 205968 ||  || — || June 3, 2002 || Palomar || NEAT || NYS || align=right data-sort-value="0.76" | 760 m || 
|-id=969 bgcolor=#d6d6d6
| 205969 ||  || — || June 14, 2002 || Palomar || NEAT || EOS || align=right | 2.7 km || 
|-id=970 bgcolor=#fefefe
| 205970 ||  || — || July 6, 2002 || Palomar || NEAT || — || align=right | 2.7 km || 
|-id=971 bgcolor=#E9E9E9
| 205971 ||  || — || July 8, 2002 || Palomar || NEAT || — || align=right | 2.3 km || 
|-id=972 bgcolor=#d6d6d6
| 205972 ||  || — || July 10, 2002 || Campo Imperatore || CINEOS || — || align=right | 3.1 km || 
|-id=973 bgcolor=#E9E9E9
| 205973 ||  || — || July 11, 2002 || Campo Imperatore || CINEOS || — || align=right | 1.3 km || 
|-id=974 bgcolor=#E9E9E9
| 205974 ||  || — || July 9, 2002 || Socorro || LINEAR || — || align=right | 1.4 km || 
|-id=975 bgcolor=#E9E9E9
| 205975 ||  || — || July 9, 2002 || Socorro || LINEAR || JUN || align=right | 1.5 km || 
|-id=976 bgcolor=#E9E9E9
| 205976 ||  || — || July 9, 2002 || Socorro || LINEAR || RAF || align=right | 1.8 km || 
|-id=977 bgcolor=#E9E9E9
| 205977 ||  || — || July 9, 2002 || Socorro || LINEAR || — || align=right | 2.6 km || 
|-id=978 bgcolor=#d6d6d6
| 205978 ||  || — || July 14, 2002 || Palomar || NEAT || THM || align=right | 3.6 km || 
|-id=979 bgcolor=#E9E9E9
| 205979 ||  || — || July 14, 2002 || Palomar || NEAT || — || align=right | 3.5 km || 
|-id=980 bgcolor=#E9E9E9
| 205980 ||  || — || July 14, 2002 || Palomar || NEAT || — || align=right | 5.0 km || 
|-id=981 bgcolor=#E9E9E9
| 205981 ||  || — || July 12, 2002 || Palomar || NEAT || — || align=right | 3.0 km || 
|-id=982 bgcolor=#E9E9E9
| 205982 ||  || — || July 13, 2002 || Palomar || NEAT || — || align=right | 4.9 km || 
|-id=983 bgcolor=#E9E9E9
| 205983 ||  || — || July 13, 2002 || Palomar || NEAT || — || align=right | 2.2 km || 
|-id=984 bgcolor=#E9E9E9
| 205984 ||  || — || July 13, 2002 || Haleakala || NEAT || — || align=right | 3.3 km || 
|-id=985 bgcolor=#E9E9E9
| 205985 ||  || — || July 4, 2002 || Palomar || NEAT || — || align=right | 2.4 km || 
|-id=986 bgcolor=#E9E9E9
| 205986 ||  || — || July 14, 2002 || Palomar || NEAT || — || align=right | 2.6 km || 
|-id=987 bgcolor=#E9E9E9
| 205987 ||  || — || July 2, 2002 || Palomar || NEAT || — || align=right | 1.6 km || 
|-id=988 bgcolor=#E9E9E9
| 205988 ||  || — || July 5, 2002 || Palomar || NEAT || — || align=right | 2.8 km || 
|-id=989 bgcolor=#E9E9E9
| 205989 ||  || — || July 14, 2002 || Palomar || NEAT || — || align=right | 2.8 km || 
|-id=990 bgcolor=#E9E9E9
| 205990 ||  || — || July 18, 2002 || Socorro || LINEAR || — || align=right | 5.6 km || 
|-id=991 bgcolor=#E9E9E9
| 205991 ||  || — || July 17, 2002 || Socorro || LINEAR || MAR || align=right | 2.1 km || 
|-id=992 bgcolor=#E9E9E9
| 205992 ||  || — || July 23, 2002 || Palomar || NEAT || MAR || align=right | 2.5 km || 
|-id=993 bgcolor=#E9E9E9
| 205993 ||  || — || July 23, 2002 || Palomar || S. F. Hönig || — || align=right | 1.9 km || 
|-id=994 bgcolor=#E9E9E9
| 205994 ||  || — || July 30, 2002 || Haleakala || A. Lowe || — || align=right | 3.2 km || 
|-id=995 bgcolor=#E9E9E9
| 205995 ||  || — || July 22, 2002 || Palomar || NEAT || — || align=right | 3.3 km || 
|-id=996 bgcolor=#E9E9E9
| 205996 ||  || — || August 5, 2002 || Palomar || NEAT || — || align=right | 4.0 km || 
|-id=997 bgcolor=#E9E9E9
| 205997 ||  || — || August 6, 2002 || Palomar || NEAT || — || align=right | 2.2 km || 
|-id=998 bgcolor=#E9E9E9
| 205998 ||  || — || August 6, 2002 || Palomar || NEAT || — || align=right | 1.8 km || 
|-id=999 bgcolor=#fefefe
| 205999 ||  || — || August 6, 2002 || Palomar || NEAT || MAS || align=right | 1.2 km || 
|-id=000 bgcolor=#d6d6d6
| 206000 ||  || — || August 6, 2002 || Palomar || NEAT || BRA || align=right | 2.4 km || 
|}

References

External links 
 Discovery Circumstances: Numbered Minor Planets (205001)–(210000) (IAU Minor Planet Center)

0205